= John of Gaunt's chevauchée of 1373 =

1373 mounted raid during the Hundred Years' War

Chevauchée of John of Gaunt (1373) Grande chevauchée
- Part of Hundred Years' War
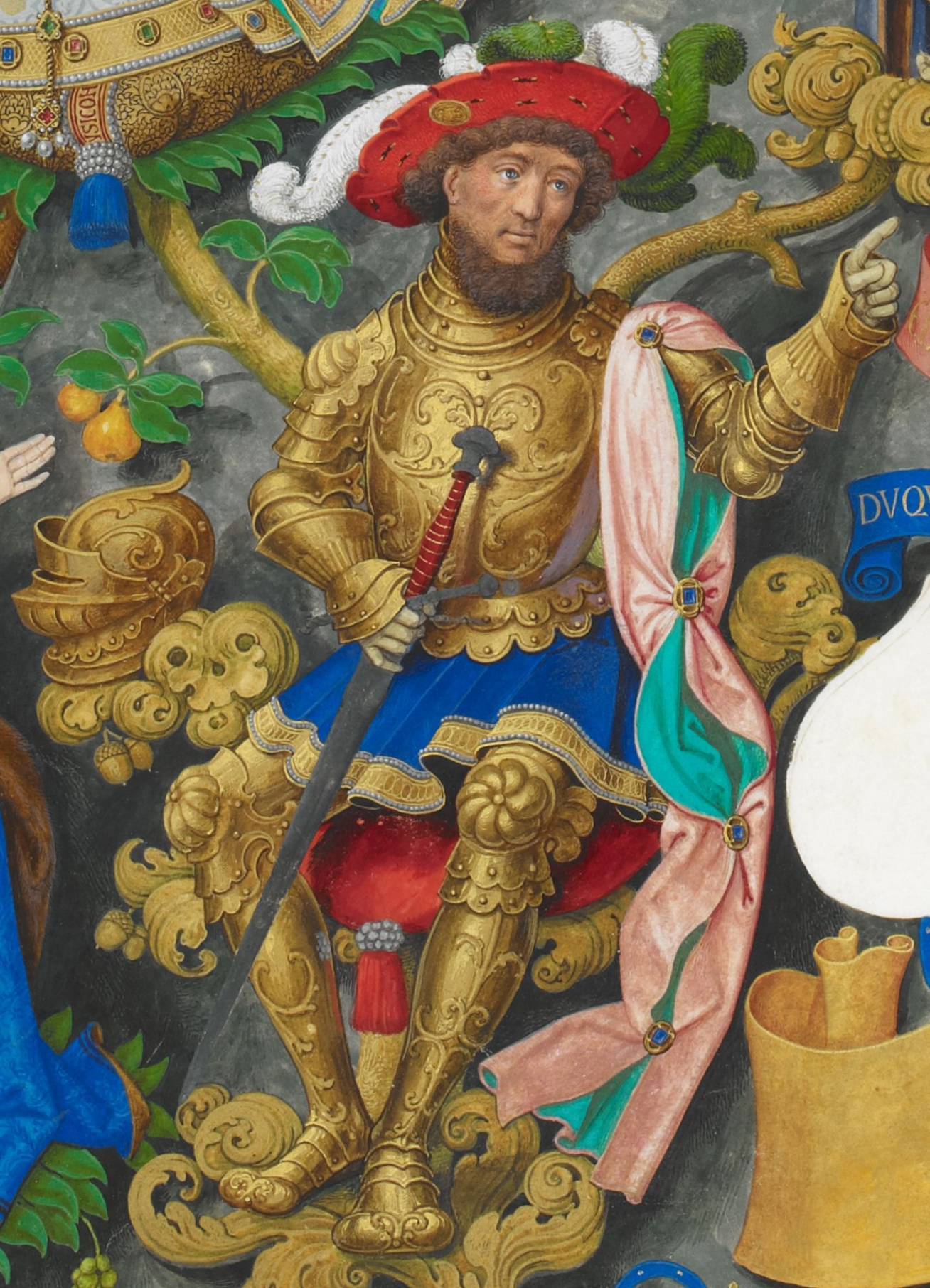
- John of Gaunt, Duke of Lancaster
Date	9 August – December 1373
Location	France
Result	French victory

Belligerents
Kingdom of England; Duchy of Aquitaine	Kingdom of France

Commanders and leaders
John of Gaunt; John IV of Brittany; Edward Despenser; Thomas Beauchamp; William Ufford	Philip the Bold; Bertrand du Guesclin; Olivier V de Clisson; Louis I of Anjou; Louis II of Bourbon; Louis de Sancerre; Philip of Orléans; Jean III de Bueil; Jean de Rohan

Strength
~9,000	Unknown

Casualties and losses
~6,000 killed or captured	Unknown

John of Gaunt's chevauchée of 1373 was an English military raid at the end of the second period of the Hundred Years' War by John of Gaunt, Duke of Lancaster, from his departure from Calais in August 1373 to his arrival at Bordeaux at the end of December 1373.

With more than 1,500 km (930 mi) covered, it is the longest of the chevauchées organised by the English on the continent. Despite the devastation caused, it was a failure for the English crown because of the weak military and political results, and the enormous losses.

== Background ==
War had resumed in 1369 and Charles V of France, a wise politician and strategist, strove to progressively recapture the English possessions on the continent. Edward III, who ruled England, had been suffering military setbacks for some years. Calais, Brittany, the Atlantic coast to the south of the Gironde estuary and the county of Angoulême were the only territories which remained loyal to him.

His second son, John of Gaunt, was born in 1340. He was the recent widower of Blanche of Lancaster, who by giving him the duchy of Lancaster (one of the three counties palatine of England since the 12th century) had made him one of the richest landowners of the country. He was described as a brave warrior, but less competent than his older brother Edward the Black Prince. At the end of 1369, he had already led a disappointing chevauchée through Artois, Picardy and Normandy before turning back toward Calais.

At the end of 1372, the Parliament of England approved a project to reinforce the naval forces and to send an expeditionary force of 4,000 men led by John of Gaunt. According to the initial plan, he would land in Brittany to restore the authority of John IV of Brittany, then cross the river Loire at Nantes and enter Aquitaine through Bas-Poitou.

However, during the first half of 1373, the English situation in Brittany had considerably worsened: the French had retaken Nantes, which destroyed Gaunt's hope to cross the river Loire there. Only three places remained friendly: Derval, defended by the free companies of Robert Knolles; Brest in the hands of John Neville, 3rd Baron Neville; and Auray, held by the duchess of Brittany, Joan Holland, second wife of Duke John IV of Brittany. In this context, the road to Aquitaine was compromised, and the plan was abandoned in May. Furthermore, the English naval strength was too weak to attempt a direct transportation through the Bay of Biscay. The only remaining option was a landing at Calais, bypassing Paris to the east.

== Tactics ==
Since he had become king, Charles V had as much as possible avoided exposing his knights to pitched battles.

In response, the English applied the tactic of the chevauchée, whose goal was to ravage the countryside. On the widest possible front, their columns looted the rural areas, burned the harvests and destroyed the infrastructure. They lived off the land and gathered to attack those of the cities which refused to pay them. The model had been inaugurated by Edward III in 1346, then improved by the Black Prince in Languedoc in 1355 and in Poitou in 1356.

Charles V and the Constable of France Bertrand du Guesclin developed a tactic in response: to put the population inside strongholds with supplies and livestock, and to destroy what could not be protected. The soldiers gathered inside castles and fortified cities, while mobile troops harassed the enemy columns and disturbed their lines of supply. These columns were condemned to march on scorched earth surrounded by strongholds.

== Chevauchée ==
=== Gathering at Calais ===
In spite of the modification of the plan and the lack of interest from John of Brittany for the new itinerary, the latter joined his forces to those of Lancaster, probably half-heartedly. The responsibility of going by sea to support Neville and Knolles at Brest, who by now had to eat their own horses, went to the Earl of Salisbury. They landed at Calais at the beginning of July 1373. There they gathered, until on 9 August, brought by a fleet of more than a hundred ships requisitioned in the eastern harbours of the island or chartered in Holland and Flanders, an army of 6,000 archers and 3,000 men-at-arms (including 1,800 Scottish mercenaries), accompanied by 2,000 non-combatants. The troops were commanded by the Constable Edward Despenser, assisted by the Marshals Thomas Beauchamp and William Ufford. Several English noblemen were with them, like Henry Percy, 1st Earl of Northumberland, and several prestigious captains as Hugh Calveley or Walter Hewitt.

=== Bypassing Paris ===
The reconquest by Charles V of the territories conceded by the treaty of Brétigny in 1360. In yellow, John of Gaunt's chevauchée in 1373.

Jean Froissart wrote, in 1835, that after Lancaster and the Duke of Brittany, an their troops, "had refreshed themselves in the city of Calais, and all their equipment was ready, their wagons loaded, and their horses shod, they set out one Wednesday morning, banners unfurled, and passed before Guînes and Ardres, and also before the castle of Montoire, which Hondecourt, a knight of Picardy, guarded. But the English never stopped there to attack; rather, they passed on, and came to lodge on that beautiful river which flows from Hosque." The troops left Calais, separated in two columns, with the one of John IV marching southward, towards Hesdin, to make junction at the river Somme east of Amiens. The other, led by John of Gaunt, marched 60 kilometres (37 mi) further east. He passed in front of Guînes and Ardres, which were allied to him. For the first night of bivouacking, the English camp stretched over several miles, between Balinghem and Licques. On the next day, the soldiers rode to Saint-Omer, held by a vassal of the king of France. There, a few hours later at Thérouanne where 1,200 French soldiers were gathered, no fight was engaged, each side observing the enemy beyond the fortifications.

The column advanced around ten kilometers a day, pillaging and burning on a 20 km (12 mi) wide front. At the vanguard walked the troops commanded by the Marshals, followed by the group under orders from the two Dukes. Behind were the supply chariots. Finally, the Constable's army closed the march. The width of the front was a consequence of the need to sufficiently supply the men in food, but offered the disadvantage of having the groups dispersed, at the mercy of attacks from the French cavalry, or even peasants.

This is how, on the following days, the invaders confronted French soldiers in Artois, in the outskirts of Aire-sur-la-Lys and Saint-Pol-sur-Ternoise. A violent skirmish happened before the walls of Doullens, which was almost captured. Around 19 August the two Dukes made junction on the Somme, after John of Gaunt, passing next to Arras, also failed to take Bray-sur-Somme.

In the meantime in Amiens, in the French camp, Philip the Bold was completing his army to face them. Charles V had also called in reinforcement the troops of the captains stationed in Brittany: Bertrand du Guesclin, temporarily blocked in Derval, and with him, Olivier de Clisson, nicknamed the Butcher, the Viscount of Rohan, Jean de Bueil, etc. In Ribemont-sur-Ancre, the latter, supported by the lords of Chin and Bousies and 120 soldiers, attacked 80 soldiers of Hugh of Calveley, routing them. Continuing on their destructive path, the invaders set Roye on fire, whose inhabitants had sought refuge inside the fortified church.

Around 3 September, the Dukes spent three days in Vaux-sur-Laon, a suburb of Laon, while their troops looted and ransacked the countryside without the 1,800 French and Breton soldiers of Laon preventing them to do so. Then, the army headed to Soissons, closely followed by about 2,400 men led by Philip of Burgundy, who applied the strategy of avoiding pitched battles: his men ordered the civilians to take refuge inside cities, got the livestock safe, left a garrison inside each fortification and destroyed the bridges in order to hinder and to guide their enemies.

Anecdotally, the land of Coucy was spared: its lord Enguerrand VII de Coucy, married to Isabella of England, eldest daughter of Edward III, did his best to maintain a cautious neutrality.

On 9 September 1373, on the contrary, the French attacked at Oulchy an isolated English corps, killing its captain Walter Hewitt and numerous men, and capturing several knights and squires, of which Thomas Despenser, brother of the Constable of England himself. But no other incident disturbed the first part of the chevauchée: the English closed ranks and the French followed the instructions of Charles V.

Gradually the French troops, taken by surprise by the landing at Calais, were growing stronger: from Harfleur, the Duke Philip of Orléans was coming with the army of the sea.

While John of Gaunt and John of Brittany were invading the Champagne province, burning Vertus, looting and ravaging Hermonville, Ville-Dommange, Le Meix-Tiercelin, Margerie, Epernay and the countryside around Châlons-en-Champagne, Du Guesclin was heading East, via Paris where he talked with the king. Consequently, when the English arrived before Troyes, around 22 September, Du Guesclin, Olivier de Clisson, Louis II of Bourbon, the Duke of Burgundy and more than 7,000 men in garrison had been waiting for them for a week. The position was key: it prevented any English attempt to march on Paris through Gâtinais, as Edward III in his chevauchée of 1359 or to march on Brittany, as Robert Knolles in his chevauchée of 1370. The English left, around 25 September. Froissart writes:

This is how the Duke of Lancaster and the Duke of Brittany rode in the kingdom of France, and led their men; never did they find anyone to talk to in matter of battle [...]; they often sent their heralds to the lords who were pursuing them, looking for battle [...]; but never did the French want to accept.

=== Heading south ===
The two Dukes then went up the Seine, finding a way around the end of September at Gyé-sur-Seine, then heading south to Nivernais.

The French were following the advance of their enemy, in two columns marching in parallel, one on their right flank, the other on their left flank, away of an hour of march from each other. They spent each night in castles or fortified cities, while the English were compelled to bivouacking.

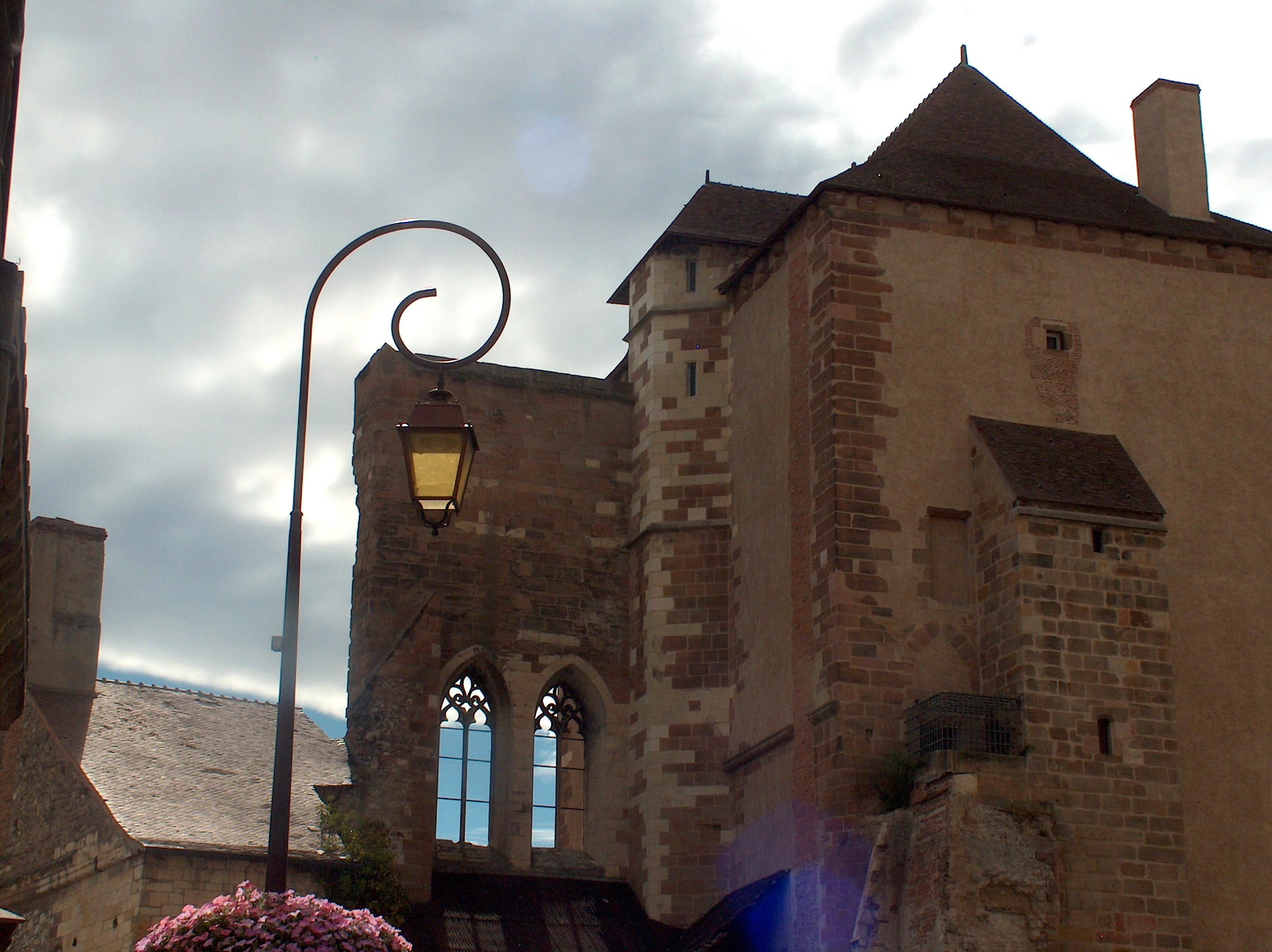
La Mal Coiffée, remnants of the walls (14th c.) of Moulins

Around 10 October the chevauchée crossed the Loire river at the bridge of Marcigny, leaving behind in Charolais a devastated path. The crossing of the Allier river proved more dangerous, and John of Gaunt was forced to go North West towards Moulins where the old bridge stone was one of the rare ways to cross the river. He was almost captured: Louis I of Bourbon was himself in Souvigny on the western bank, and his garrison was stationed at Moulins. Coming from the south-east, Bertrand du Guesclin was tracking down the English, while on 18 October Philip of Burgundy had taken position at the south-west at Saint-Pourçain-sur-Sioule, after he had crossed the Loire at Roanne. Finally, the king had urgently called back from Brittany his brother the Duke of Anjou, who was converging north towards the town with his infantry and archers corps. The English narrowly escaped, but they had to abandon plenty of supply wagons.

And the situation got worse at the approach of winter and a poorer countryside: Auvergne, Limousin, Rouergue, Agenais. At the beginning of November, the French lightened their presence: Louis of Anjou went back to Languedoc, Philip of Burgundy disbanded his mercenaries and rejoined his duchy, the infantry of the North returned to its garrisons. The Marshal of Sancerre took the lead of the operations.

In Combrailles and Upper Limousin, John of Gaunt's soldiers found themselves in one of the most inhospitable regions of France in winter: the dense forest, glacial and almost uninhabited doesn't offer more resources for the horses than for the men; the cold and torrential rain turns the roads into swamps, filling the streams with a muddy water. The horsemen of Sancerre harassed the flanks of the column, and the English left behind them a long trail of horses, dead of starvation.

Finally, at the beginning of December 1373, the Duke of Lancaster arrived in the valley of the Corrèze river in Lower Limousin, a region still hostile to the authority of the king of France. He was able to rest there three weeks.

== Aftermath ==
Contrary to his older brother Edward the Black Prince, who had come back from his chevauchée of 1355 with an immense loot, John of Gaunt entered Bordeaux on the last days of 1373 with an army that was only the shadow of its former self five months before. Although no large pitched battle had happened, it was a bitter defeat: half its 30,000 horses had died en route. Two thirds of the wagons had had to be abandoned. 3,000 men had died of cold, disease or starvation, and 3,000 had been killed or captured by the French. Many who had made it to Bordeaux died a few days or months later, Edward Despenser himself died in 1375 from an illness probably contracted during the chevauchée. A great number had been captured by the French, and most of them would still be imprisoned three years later.

In Bordeaux, the situation was critical: the remnants of the chevauchée had doubled the population of the town, who had to endure an epidemic of bubonic plague during that winter. Some knights were even begging in the streets for a bit of food. From London, the money expected to pay the troops wasn't coming, and John of Gaunt could now only count on a sick army, demoralized and depleted by desertion. John IV of Brittany returned by sea to his duchy with a thousand men. At the end of March 1374, Lancaster had to renounce to his planned invasion of Castile, allied to France, despite the support of Peter IV of Aragon, of Gaston III, Count of Foix and of Charles II of Navarre. On 8 April 1374 he left for England.
