= Soulanges =

Soulanges may refer to:

- Soulanges (federal electoral district), a former federal electoral district in Quebec, Canada
- Soulanges (provincial electoral district), a provincial electoral district in Quebec
- Soulanges, Marne, a commune in the Marne department, France
- Vaudreuil-Soulanges Regional County Municipality, Quebec
- Claude-René Pâris, Count of Soulanges
