= La Chaussée-sur-Marne =

- Commune
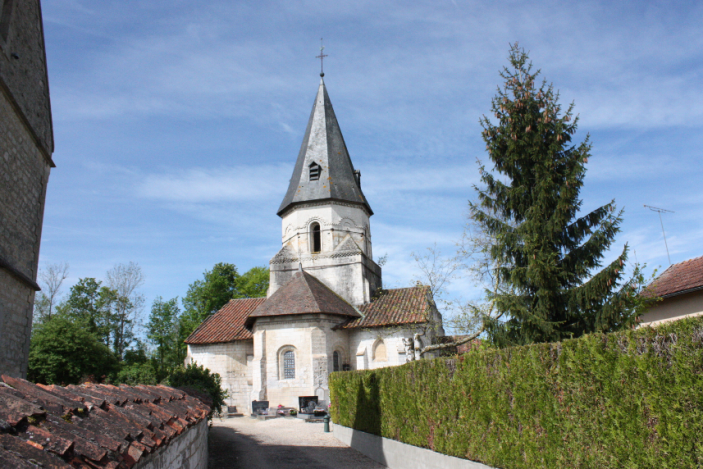
- The church in La Chaussée-sur-Marne
- Location of La Chaussée-sur-Marne
- Location within France Location within Grand Est
- Coordinates: 48°50′06″N 4°31′25″E
- Country: France
- Region: Grand Est
- Department: Marne
- Arrondissement: Vitry-le-François
- Canton: Vitry-le-François-Champagne et Der

Government
  - Mayor (2020–2026): André Castagna
- Area^{1}: 22.05 km^{2} (8.51 sq mi)
- Highest elevation: 187 m (614 ft)
- Lowest elevation: 87 m (285 ft)
- Population (2023): 758
  - Density: 34.4/km^{2} (89.0/sq mi)
- Time zone: UTC+01:00 (CET)
  - Summer (DST): UTC+02:00 (CEST)
- INSEE/Postal code: 51141 /51240
- ^{1} French Land Register data, which excludes lakes, ponds, glaciers > 1 km^{2} (0.386 sq mi or 247 acres) and river estuaries.

La Chaussée-sur-Marne (French pronunciation: [la ʃose syʁ maʁn], literally La Chaussée on Marne) is a commune in the Marne department in the Grand Est region in north-eastern France. It is part of the canton of Vitry-le-François-Champagne et Der and the arrondissement of Vitry-le-François.

== Geography and map ==
The altitude of the commune of La Chaussée-sur-Marne ranges between 87 and 187 meters. The area of the commune is 22.05 km^{2}. The nearest larger town is Vitry-le-François, 13 km to the south.

== Population and housing ==
As of 2023, the population of the commune was 758. As of 2019, there were 349 dwellings in the commune, of which 322 primary residences.

== See also ==
- Communes of the Marne department
