= Lignon =

Lignon may refer to:

- Lignon, Marne, a commune in northern France
- Lignon du Forez, a river in south-central France, left tributary of the Loire
- Lignon du Velay, a river in south-central France, right tributary of the Loire
- Lignon (Ardèche), a river in south-central France, right tributary of the Ardèche
- Le Lignon, a community in Vernier, Switzerland in the Geneva metropolitan area
