= Coutrot =

Coutrot (French: [kutʁo]) is a French surname. Notable people with the surname include:

- Jacques Coutrot (1898–1965), French fencer
- Jean Coutrot (1895–1941), French engineer
- Maurice Coutrot (1907–1992), French politician

== See also ==
- Couvrot
