= Blaise-sous-Arzillières =

- Commune
- Coat of arms
- Location of Blaise-sous-Arzillières
- Location within France Location within Grand Est
- Coordinates: 48°40′21″N 4°35′03″E
- Country: France
- Region: Grand Est
- Department: Marne
- Arrondissement: Vitry-le-François
- Canton: Vitry-le-François-Champagne et Der

Government
  - Mayor (2020–2026): Jacques Fortin
- Area^{1}: 6.89 km^{2} (2.66 sq mi)
- Elevation: 105 m (344 ft)
- Population (2023): 316
  - Density: 45.9/km^{2} (119/sq mi)
- Time zone: UTC+01:00 (CET)
  - Summer (DST): UTC+02:00 (CEST)
- INSEE/Postal code: 51066 /51300
- ^{1} French Land Register data, which excludes lakes, ponds, glaciers > 1 km^{2} (0.386 sq mi or 247 acres) and river estuaries.

Blaise-sous-Arzillières (French pronunciation: [blɛz su.z‿aʁziljɛʁ], literally Blaise under Arzillières) is a commune of the Marne department in northeastern France.

== Population ==
Historical population
Year	Pop.	±% p.a.
1968	508	—
1975	480	−0.81%
1982	414	−2.09%
1990	396	−0.55%
1999	377	−0.54%
2007	354	−0.78%
2012	332	−1.28%
2017	342	+0.60%
2023	316	−1.31%
Source: INSEE

== See also ==
- Communes of the Marne department
