= Coole, Marne =

Coole
- Commune
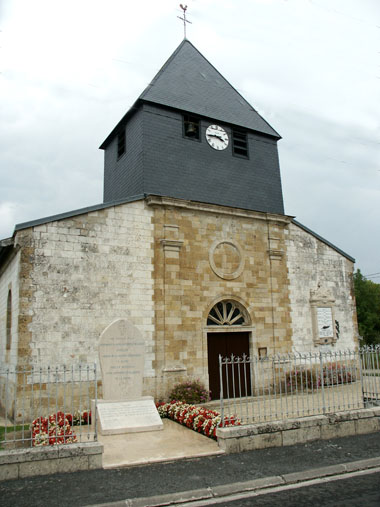
- The church in Coole

- Coat of arms
- Location of Coole
- Location within France Location within Grand Est
- Coordinates: 48°44′31″N 4°23′36″E
- Country: France
- Region: Grand Est
- Department: Marne
- Arrondissement: Vitry-le-François
- Canton: Vitry-le-François-Champagne et Der
- Intercommunality: CC Vitry, Champagne et Der

Government
  - Mayor (2020–2026): Jean-Claude Dulieux
- Area^{1}: 29.92 km^{2} (11.55 sq mi)
- Elevation: 159 m (522 ft)
- Population (2023): 157
  - Density: 5.25/km^{2} (13.6/sq mi)
- Demonym: Coolat(e)(s)
- Time zone: UTC+01:00 (CET)
  - Summer (DST): UTC+02:00 (CEST)
- INSEE/Postal code: 51167 /51320
- ^{1} French Land Register data, which excludes lakes, ponds, glaciers > 1 km^{2} (0.386 sq mi or 247 acres) and river estuaries.

Coole (French pronunciation: [kɔl]) is a commune in the Marne department in north-eastern France.

== Geography ==
Coole is situated at the intersection of the N4 highway and the D4 road. The N4 connects Sézanne to the east with Vitry-le-François to the west. The D4 goes south to Sompuis and north to Coolus, near Châlons-en-Champagne. The town is near the source of the Coole River which flows northward before emptying into the Marne River near Coolus.

On the 1757 map drawn by César-François Cassini de Thury, the original name of the river was Côle and the name of the town was Cosle.

== See also ==
- Communes of the Marne department
