= Pringy =

Pringy may refer to:

In France

- Pringy, Marne, in the Marne département
- Pringy, Haute-Savoie, in the Haute-Savoie département
- Pringy, Seine-et-Marne, in the Seine-et-Marne département

In Switzerland

- Pringy, Gruyère, village in the Gruyère (district)
