= Maisons-en-Champagne =

- Commune
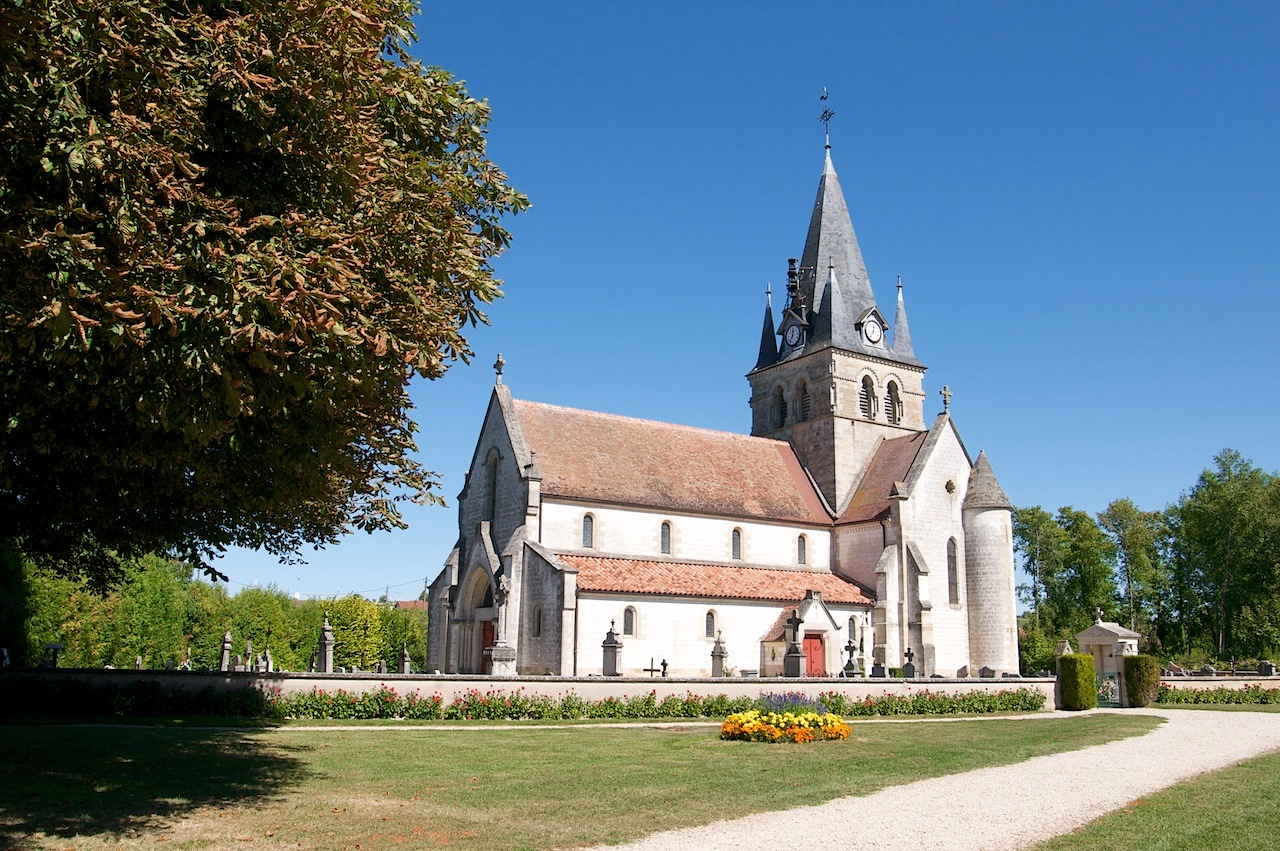
- The church in Maisons-en-Champagne

- Coat of arms
- Location of Maisons-en-Champagne
- Location within France Location within Grand Est
- Coordinates: 48°44′59″N 4°29′49″E
- Country: France
- Region: Grand Est
- Department: Marne
- Arrondissement: Vitry-le-François
- Canton: Vitry-le-François-Champagne et Der

Government
  - Mayor (2020–2026): Christian Moulin
- Area^{1}: 29.14 km^{2} (11.25 sq mi)
- Elevation: 113 m (371 ft)
- Population (2023): 552
  - Density: 18.9/km^{2} (49.1/sq mi)
- Time zone: UTC+01:00 (CET)
  - Summer (DST): UTC+02:00 (CEST)
- INSEE/Postal code: 51340 /51300
- ^{1} French Land Register data, which excludes lakes, ponds, glaciers > 1 km^{2} (0.386 sq mi or 247 acres) and river estuaries.

Maisons-en-Champagne (French pronunciation: [mɛzɔ̃ ɑ̃ ʃɑ̃paɲ]) is a commune in the Marne department in north-eastern France.

== See also ==
- Communes of the Marne department
