= Bréban =

- Commune
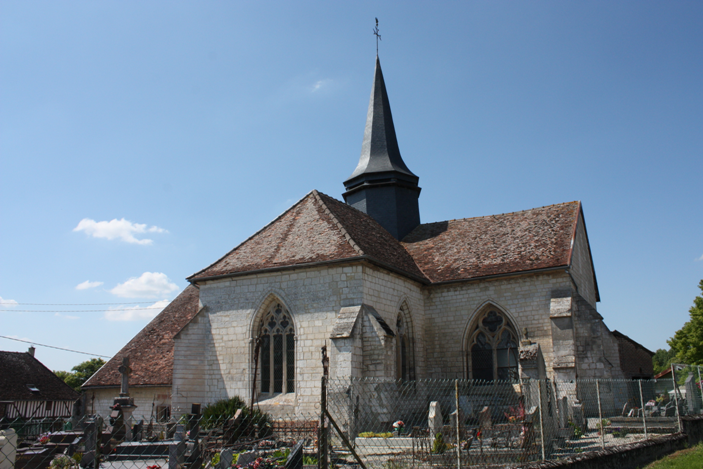
- The church in Bréban
- Location of Bréban
- Location within France Location within Grand Est
- Coordinates: 48°34′46″N 4°24′19″E
- Country: France
- Region: Grand Est
- Department: Marne
- Arrondissement: Vitry-le-François
- Canton: Vitry-le-François-Champagne et Der

Government
  - Mayor (2020–2026): Philippe Veber
- Area^{1}: 10.57 km^{2} (4.08 sq mi)
- Elevation: 115 m (377 ft)
- Population (2023): 85
  - Density: 8.0/km^{2} (21/sq mi)
- Time zone: UTC+01:00 (CET)
  - Summer (DST): UTC+02:00 (CEST)
- INSEE/Postal code: 51084 /51320
- ^{1} French Land Register data, which excludes lakes, ponds, glaciers > 1 km^{2} (0.386 sq mi or 247 acres) and river estuaries.

Bréban (French pronunciation: [bʁebɑ̃]) is a commune in the Marne department in northeastern France. An important Merovingian grave group was found in the vicinity of Bréban in the nineteenth century. It is now held by the British Museum.

== Population ==
Historical population
Year	Pop.	±% p.a.
1968	101	—
1975	91	−1.48%
1982	93	+0.31%
1990	82	−1.56%
1999	91	+1.16%
2007	85	−0.85%
2012	93	+1.82%
2017	81	−2.73%
2023	85	+0.81%
Source: INSEE

== See also ==
- Communes of the Marne department
