= Bignicourt-sur-Marne =

- Commune
- Location of Bignicourt-sur-Marne
- Location within France Location within Grand Est
- Coordinates: 48°40′59″N 4°36′35″E
- Country: France
- Region: Grand Est
- Department: Marne
- Arrondissement: Vitry-le-François
- Canton: Vitry-le-François-Champagne et Der

Government
  - Mayor (2020–2026): Jean-Pierre Formet
- Area^{1}: 2.83 km^{2} (1.09 sq mi)
- Elevation: 105 m (344 ft)
- Population (2023): 381
  - Density: 135/km^{2} (349/sq mi)
- Time zone: UTC+01:00 (CET)
  - Summer (DST): UTC+02:00 (CEST)
- INSEE/Postal code: 51059 /51300
- ^{1} French Land Register data, which excludes lakes, ponds, glaciers > 1 km^{2} (0.386 sq mi or 247 acres) and river estuaries.

Bignicourt-sur-Marne (French pronunciation: [biɲikuʁ syʁ maʁn], literally Bignicourt on Marne) is a commune of the Marne department in northeastern France.

== Population ==
Historical population
Year	Pop.	±% p.a.
1968	232	—
1975	288	+3.14%
1982	341	+2.44%
1990	381	+1.40%
1999	374	−0.21%
2007	409	+1.12%
2012	357	−2.68%
2017	343	−0.80%
2023	381	+1.77%
Source: INSEE

== See also ==
- Communes of the Marne department
