= Saint-Ouen-Domprot =

- Commune
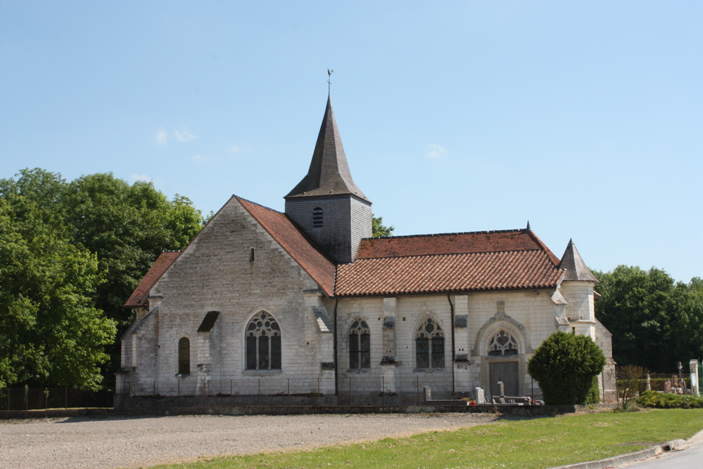
- The church in Saint-Ouen-Domprot
- Location of Saint-Ouen-Domprot
- Location within France Location within Grand Est
- Coordinates: 48°36′35″N 4°24′32″E
- Country: France
- Region: Grand Est
- Department: Marne
- Arrondissement: Vitry-le-François
- Canton: Vitry-le-François-Champagne et Der

Government
  - Mayor (2020–2026): Philippe Coquin
- Area^{1}: 37.28 km^{2} (14.39 sq mi)
- Elevation: 124 m (407 ft)
- Population (2023): 203
  - Density: 5.45/km^{2} (14.1/sq mi)
- Time zone: UTC+01:00 (CET)
  - Summer (DST): UTC+02:00 (CEST)
- INSEE/Postal code: 51508 /51320
- ^{1} French Land Register data, which excludes lakes, ponds, glaciers > 1 km^{2} (0.386 sq mi or 247 acres) and river estuaries.

Saint-Ouen-Domprot (French pronunciation: [sɛ̃.t‿wɛ̃ dɔ̃pʁo]) is a commune in the Marne department in north-eastern France.

== See also ==
- Communes of the Marne department
