= Marolles, Marne =

Marolles
- Commune
- Coat of arms
- Location of Marolles
- Location within France Location within Grand Est
- Coordinates: 48°43′08″N 4°37′34″E
- Country: France
- Region: Grand Est
- Department: Marne
- Arrondissement: Vitry-le-François
- Canton: Vitry-le-François-Champagne et Der
- Intercommunality: Vitry, Champagne et Der

Government
  - Mayor (2020–2026): Didier Noblet
- Area^{1}: 4.38 km^{2} (1.69 sq mi)
- Elevation: 105 m (344 ft)
- Highest elevation: 114 m (374 ft)
- Lowest elevation: 100 m (330 ft)
- Population (2023): 796
  - Density: 182/km^{2} (471/sq mi)
- Time zone: UTC+01:00 (CET)
  - Summer (DST): UTC+02:00 (CEST)
- INSEE/Postal code: 51352 /51300
- ^{1} French Land Register data, which excludes lakes, ponds, glaciers > 1 km^{2} (0.386 sq mi or 247 acres) and river estuaries.

Marolles (French pronunciation: [maʁɔl]) is a commune in the Marne department in north-eastern France.

== See also ==
- Communes of the Marne department
