= Aulnay-l'Aître =

- Commune
- Location of Aulnay-l'Aître
- Location within France Location within Grand Est
- Coordinates: 48°49′24″N 4°33′39″E
- Country: France
- Region: Grand Est
- Department: Marne
- Arrondissement: Vitry-le-François
- Canton: Vitry-le-François-Champagne et Der
- Intercommunality: CC Vitry Champagne Der

Government
  - Mayor (2020–2026): Michel Lonclas
- Area^{1}: 8.36 km^{2} (3.23 sq mi)
- Elevation: 156 m (512 ft)
- Population (2023): 168
  - Density: 20.1/km^{2} (52.0/sq mi)
- Time zone: UTC+01:00 (CET)
  - Summer (DST): UTC+02:00 (CEST)
- INSEE/Postal code: 51022 /51240
- ^{1} French Land Register data, which excludes lakes, ponds, glaciers > 1 km^{2} (0.386 sq mi or 247 acres) and river estuaries.

Aulnay-l'Aître (French pronunciation: [o(l)nɛ lɛtʁ]) is a commune in the Marne department in northeastern France.

== Population ==
Historical population
Year	Pop.	±% p.a.
1968	124	—
1975	111	−1.57%
1982	127	+1.94%
1990	129	+0.20%
1999	122	−0.62%
2007	134	+1.18%
2012	143	+1.31%
2017	181	+4.83%
2023	168	−1.23%
Source: INSEE

== See also ==
- Communes of the Marne department
