= Huiron =

- Commune
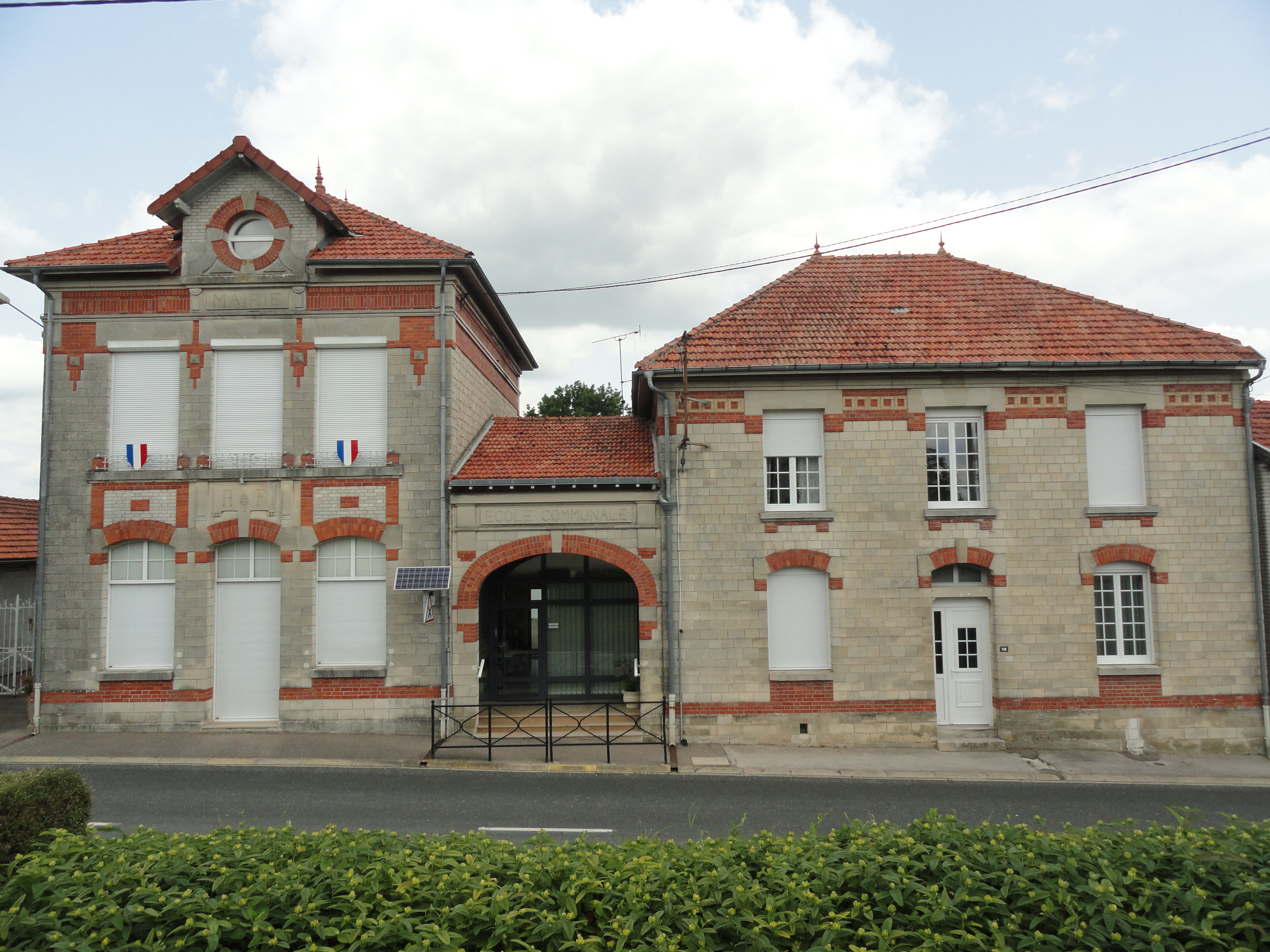
- The town hall in Huiron

- Coat of arms
- Location of Huiron
- Location within France Location within Grand Est
- Coordinates: 48°42′10″N 4°32′31″E
- Country: France
- Region: Grand Est
- Department: Marne
- Arrondissement: Vitry-le-François
- Canton: Vitry-le-François-Champagne et Der
- Intercommunality: Vitry, Champagne et Der

Government
  - Mayor (2020–2026): Muriel Armanetti
- Area^{1}: 13.28 km^{2} (5.13 sq mi)
- Elevation: 112 m (367 ft)
- Population (2023): 302
  - Density: 22.7/km^{2} (58.9/sq mi)
- Time zone: UTC+01:00 (CET)
  - Summer (DST): UTC+02:00 (CEST)
- INSEE/Postal code: 51295 /51300
- ^{1} French Land Register data, which excludes lakes, ponds, glaciers > 1 km^{2} (0.386 sq mi or 247 acres) and river estuaries.

Huiron (French pronunciation: [ɥiʁɔ̃]) is a commune in the Marne department in north-eastern France.

== See also ==
- Communes of the Marne department
