= Somsois =

- Commune
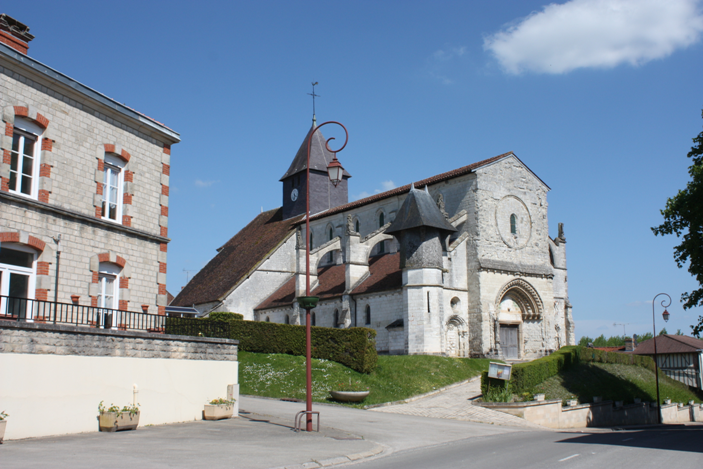
- The church in Somsois

- Coat of arms
- Location of Somsois
- Location within France Location within Grand Est
- Coordinates: 48°35′48″N 4°30′15″E
- Country: France
- Region: Grand Est
- Department: Marne
- Arrondissement: Vitry-le-François
- Canton: Vitry-le-François-Champagne et Der
- Intercommunality: CC Vitry, Champagne et Der

Government
  - Mayor (2020–2026): Joël Loiselet
- Area^{1}: 21.31 km^{2} (8.23 sq mi)
- Elevation: 137 m (449 ft)
- Population (2023): 188
  - Density: 8.82/km^{2} (22.8/sq mi)
- Time zone: UTC+01:00 (CET)
  - Summer (DST): UTC+02:00 (CEST)
- INSEE/Postal code: 51551 /51290
- ^{1} French Land Register data, which excludes lakes, ponds, glaciers > 1 km^{2} (0.386 sq mi or 247 acres) and river estuaries.

Somsois (French pronunciation: [sɔ̃swa]) is a commune in the Marne department in north-eastern France.

== See also ==
- Communes of the Marne department
