= Canton of Vitry-le-François-Champagne et Der =

Coordinates: 48.73°N 4.59°E

The canton of Vitry-le-François-Champagne et Der is an administrative division of the Marne department, northeastern France. It was created at the French canton reorganisation which came into effect in March 2015. Its seat is in Vitry-le-François.

It consists of the following communes:

1. Ablancourt
2. Arzillières-Neuville
3. Aulnay-l'Aître
4. Bignicourt-sur-Marne
5. Blacy
6. Blaise-sous-Arzillières
7. Bréban
8. Chapelaine
9. Châtelraould-Saint-Louvent
10. La Chaussée-sur-Marne
11. Coole
12. Corbeil
13. Courdemanges
14. Couvrot
15. Drouilly
16. Frignicourt
17. Glannes
18. Huiron
19. Humbauville
20. Lignon
21. Loisy-sur-Marne
22. Maisons-en-Champagne
23. Margerie-Hancourt
24. Marolles
25. Le Meix-Tiercelin
26. Pringy
27. Les Rivières-Henruel
28. Saint-Chéron
29. Saint-Ouen-Domprot
30. Saint-Utin
31. Sompuis
32. Somsois
33. Songy
34. Soulanges
35. Vitry-le-François
