= Glannes =

- Commune
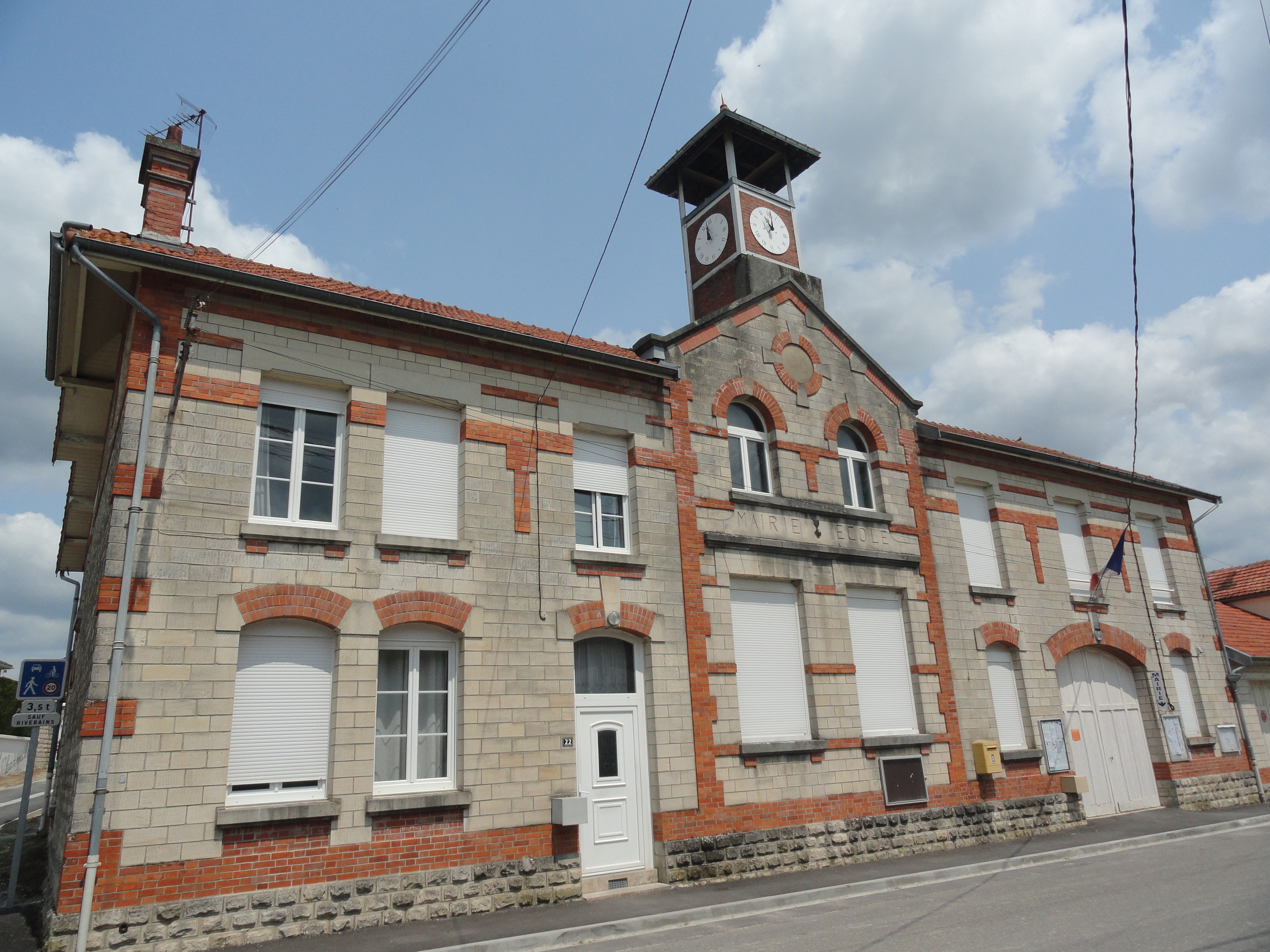
- The town hall in Glannes
- Location of Glannes
- Location within France Location within Grand Est
- Coordinates: 48°42′30″N 4°32′28″E
- Country: France
- Region: Grand Est
- Department: Marne
- Arrondissement: Vitry-le-François
- Canton: Vitry-le-François-Champagne et Der
- Intercommunality: Vitry, Champagne et Der

Government
  - Mayor (2020–2026): David Collot
- Area^{1}: 13.1 km^{2} (5.1 sq mi)
- Elevation: 109 m (358 ft)
- Population (2023): 183
  - Density: 14.0/km^{2} (36.2/sq mi)
- Time zone: UTC+01:00 (CET)
  - Summer (DST): UTC+02:00 (CEST)
- INSEE/Postal code: 51275 /51300
- ^{1} French Land Register data, which excludes lakes, ponds, glaciers > 1 km^{2} (0.386 sq mi or 247 acres) and river estuaries.

Glannes (French pronunciation: [ɡlan]) is a commune in the Marne department in north-eastern France.

== See also ==
- Communes of the Marne department
