= Humbauville =

- Commune
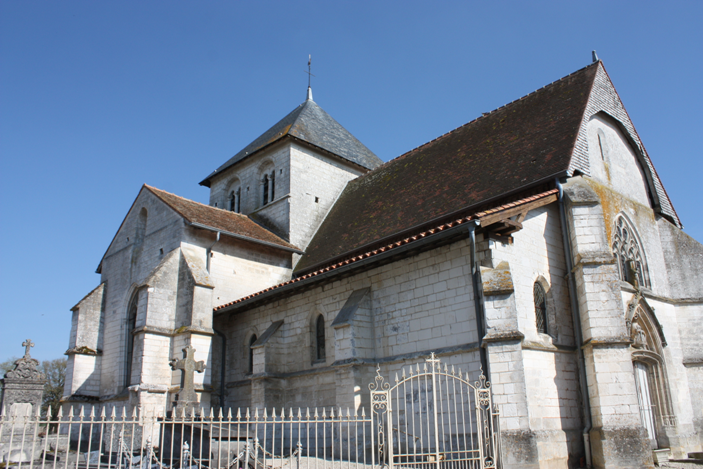
- The church in Humbauville
- Location of Humbauville
- Location within France Location within Grand Est
- Coordinates: 48°39′33″N 4°24′59″E
- Country: France
- Region: Grand Est
- Department: Marne
- Arrondissement: Vitry-le-François
- Canton: Vitry-le-François-Champagne et Der
- Intercommunality: CC Vitry, Champagne et Der

Government
  - Mayor (2020–2026): Olivier Malou-Soucat
- Area^{1}: 16.85 km^{2} (6.51 sq mi)
- Elevation: 134 m (440 ft)
- Population (2023): 74
  - Density: 4.4/km^{2} (11/sq mi)
- Time zone: UTC+01:00 (CET)
  - Summer (DST): UTC+02:00 (CEST)
- INSEE/Postal code: 51296 /51320
- ^{1} French Land Register data, which excludes lakes, ponds, glaciers > 1 km^{2} (0.386 sq mi or 247 acres) and river estuaries.

Humbauville (French pronunciation: [œ̃bovil]) is a commune in the Marne department in north-eastern France.

== See also ==
- Communes of the Marne department
