= Saint-Utin =

- Commune
- Coat of arms
- Location of Saint-Utin
- Location within France Location within Grand Est
- Coordinates: 48°33′04″N 4°30′14″E
- Country: France
- Region: Grand Est
- Department: Marne
- Arrondissement: Vitry-le-François
- Canton: Vitry-le-François-Champagne et Der

Government
  - Mayor (2020–2026): Philippe Royer
- Area^{1}: 10.17 km^{2} (3.93 sq mi)
- Elevation: 112 m (367 ft)
- Population (2023): 70
  - Density: 6.9/km^{2} (18/sq mi)
- Time zone: UTC+01:00 (CET)
  - Summer (DST): UTC+02:00 (CEST)
- INSEE/Postal code: 51520 /51290
- ^{1} French Land Register data, which excludes lakes, ponds, glaciers > 1 km^{2} (0.386 sq mi or 247 acres) and river estuaries.

Saint-Utin (French pronunciation: [sɛ̃.t‿ytɛ̃]) is a commune in the Marne department in north-eastern France.

== See also ==
- Communes of the Marne department
