= Vernancourt =

- Commune
- Location of Vernancourt
- Location within France Location within Grand Est
- Coordinates: 48°51′30″N 4°49′24″E
- Country: France
- Region: Grand Est
- Department: Marne
- Arrondissement: Vitry-le-François
- Canton: Sermaize-les-Bains
- Intercommunality: Côtes de Champagne et Val de Saulx

Government
  - Mayor (2020–2026): Jacky Berton
- Area^{1}: 8.98 km^{2} (3.47 sq mi)
- Highest elevation: 152 m (499 ft)
- Lowest elevation: 118 m (387 ft)
- Population (2023): 80
  - Density: 8.9/km^{2} (23/sq mi)
- Time zone: UTC+01:00 (CET)
  - Summer (DST): UTC+02:00 (CEST)
- INSEE/Postal code: 51608 /51330
- ^{1} French Land Register data, which excludes lakes, ponds, glaciers > 1 km^{2} (0.386 sq mi or 247 acres) and river estuaries.

Vernancourt (French pronunciation: [vɛʁnɑ̃kuʁ]) is a commune in the Marne department in north-eastern France.

== See also ==
- Communes of the Marne department
