= Communes of the Marne department =

List of communes in the department of Marne, France

The following is a list of the 610 communes in the French department of Marne.

The communes cooperate in the following intercommunalities (as of 2025):

- CU Grand Reims
- Communauté d'agglomération de Châlons-en-Champagne
- Communauté d'agglomération Épernay, Coteaux et Plaine de Champagne
- Communauté d'agglomération Grand Saint-Dizier, Der et Vallées (partly)
- Communauté de communes de l'Argonne Champenoise
- Communauté de communes de la Brie Champenoise
- Communauté de communes Côtes de Champagne et Val de Saulx
- Communauté de communes de la Grande Vallée de la Marne
- Communauté de communes de la Moivre à la Coole
- Communauté de communes des Paysages de la Champagne
- Communauté de communes Perthois-Bocage et Der
- Communauté de communes de la Région de Suippes
- Communauté de communes de Sézanne-Sud Ouest Marnais
- Communauté de communes du Sud Marnais
- Communauté de communes Vitry, Champagne et Der

INSEE code	Postal code	Commune
51001	51240	Ablancourt
51003	51150	Aigny
51004	51260	Allemanche-Launay-et-Soyer
51005	51120	Allemant
51006	51250	Alliancelles
51007	51150	Ambonnay
51008	51290	Ambrières
51009	51260	Anglure
51010	51230	Angluzelles-et-Courcelles
51012	51700	Anthenay
51013	51170	Aougny
51014	51170	Arcis-le-Ponsart
51015	51800	Argers
51016	51290	Arrigny
51017	51290	Arzillières-Neuville
51018	51150	Athis
51019	51600	Aubérive
51020	51170	Aubilly
51022	51240	Aulnay-l'Aître
51023	51150	Aulnay-sur-Marne
51025	51110	Auménancourt
51027	51800	Auve
51028	51160	Avenay-Val-d'Or
51029	51190	Avize
51030	51160	Aÿ-Champagne
51031	51400	Baconnes
51032	51260	Bagneux
51033	51270	Le Baizil
51034	51270	Bannay
51035	51230	Bannes
51036	51120	Barbonne-Fayel
51037	51170	Baslieux-lès-Fismes
51038	51700	Baslieux-sous-Châtillon
51039	51300	Bassu
51040	51300	Bassuet
51041	51260	Baudement
51042	51270	Baye
51043	51110	Bazancourt
51044	51360	Beaumont-sur-Vesle
51045	51270	Beaunay
51046	51490	Beine-Nauroy
51047	51330	Belval-en-Argonne
51048	51480	Belval-sous-Châtillon
51049	51130	Bergères-lès-Vertus
51050	51210	Bergères-sous-Montmirail
51051	51220	Berméricourt
51052	51420	Berru
51053	51800	Berzieux
51054	51490	Bétheniville
51055	51450	Bétheny
51056	51260	Bethon
51057	51330	Bettancourt-la-Longue
51058	51430	Bezannes
51059	51300	Bignicourt-sur-Marne
51060	51340	Bignicourt-sur-Saulx
51061	51400	Billy-le-Grand
51062	51800	Binarville
51065	51300	Blacy
51066	51300	Blaise-sous-Arzillières
51612	51130	Blancs-Coteaux
51068	51340	Blesme
51069	51170	Bligny
51070	51210	Boissy-le-Repos
51071	51310	Bouchy-Saint-Genest
51072	51390	Bouilly
51073	51170	Bouleuse
51074	51110	Boult-sur-Suippe
51075	51110	Bourgogne-Fresne
51076	51480	Boursault
51077	51140	Bouvancourt
51078	51400	Bouy
51079	51150	Bouzy
51080	51290	Brandonvillers
51081	51140	Branscourt
51082	51800	Braux-Sainte-Cohière
51083	51800	Braux-Saint-Remy
51084	51320	Bréban
51085	51210	Le Breuil
51086	51140	Breuil-sur-Vesle
51087	51240	Breuvery-sur-Coole
51088	51220	Brimont
51089	51170	Brouillet
51090	51230	Broussy-le-Grand
51091	51230	Broussy-le-Petit
51092	51120	Broyes
51093	51530	Brugny-Vaudancourt
51094	51300	Brusson
51095	51300	Le Buisson
51097	51600	Bussy-le-Château
51098	51330	Bussy-le-Repos
51099	51320	Bussy-Lettrée
51100	51270	La Caure
51101	51110	Caurel
51102	51220	Cauroy-lès-Hermonville
51103	51260	La Celle-sous-Chantemerle
51104	51800	Cernay-en-Dormois
51105	51420	Cernay-lès-Reims
51106	51240	Cernon
51107	51130	Chaintrix-Bierges
51108	51000	Châlons-en-Champagne
51109	51140	Châlons-sur-Vesle
51110	51130	Chaltrait
51111	51170	Chambrecy
51112	51500	Chamery
51113	51270	Champaubert
51115	51500	Champfleury
51116	51310	Champguyon
51117	51150	Champigneul-Champagne
51118	51370	Champigny
51119	51160	Champillon
51120	51480	Champlat-et-Boujacourt
51121	51700	Champvoisy
51122	51300	Changy
51124	51260	Chantemerle
51125	51290	Chapelaine
51126	51800	La Chapelle-Felcourt
51127	51260	La Chapelle-Lasson
51128	51270	La Chapelle-sous-Orbais
51129	51120	Charleville
51130	51330	Charmont
51132	51330	Les Charmontois
51133	51330	Le Châtelier
51134	51300	Châtelraould-Saint-Louvent
51135	51290	Châtillon-sur-Broué
51136	51700	Châtillon-sur-Marne
51137	51310	Châtillon-sur-Morin
51138	51800	Châtrices
51139	51800	Chaudefontaine
51140	51170	Chaumuzy
51141	51240	La Chaussée-sur-Marne
51142	51530	Chavot-Courcourt
51143	51800	Le Chemin
51144	51250	Cheminon
51145	51140	Chenay
51146	51510	Cheniers
51147	51600	La Cheppe
51148	51240	Cheppes-la-Prairie
51149	51240	Chepy
51150	51150	Cherville
51151	51120	Chichey
51152	51500	Chigny-les-Roses
51153	51530	Chouilly
51154	51130	Clamanges
51155	51260	Clesles
51156	51300	Cloyes-sur-Marne
51457	51480	Cœur-de-la-Vallée
51157	51270	Coizard-Joches
51160	51510	Compertrix
51161	51150	Condé-sur-Marne
51162	51260	Conflans-sur-Seine
51163	51270	Congy
51164	51230	Connantray-Vaurefroy
51165	51230	Connantre
51166	51330	Contault
51167	51320	Coole
51168	51510	Coolus
51169	51320	Corbeil
51170	51210	Corfélix
51171	51220	Cormicy
51172	51350	Cormontreuil
51173	51480	Cormoyeux
51174	51270	Corribert
51175	51210	Corrobert
51176	51230	Corroy
51177	51390	Coulommes-la-Montagne
51178	51240	Coupetz
51179	51240	Coupéville
51181	51140	Courcelles-Sapicourt
51182	51260	Courcemain
51183	51220	Courcy
51184	51300	Courdemanges
51185	51310	Courgivaux
51186	51270	Courjeonnet
51187	51170	Courlandon
51188	51390	Courmas
51190	51480	Courtagnon
51191	51800	Courtémont
51192	51700	Courthiézy
51193	51460	Courtisols
51194	51170	Courville
51195	51300	Couvrot
51196	51530	Cramant
51197	51600	La Croix-en-Champagne
51198	51170	Crugny
51199	51480	Cuchery
51200	51530	Cuis
51201		Cuisles
51202	51480	Cumières
51203	51400	Cuperly
51204	51480	Damery
51206	51330	Dampierre-le-Château
51208	51240	Dampierre-sur-Moivre
51210	51530	Dizy
51211	51800	Dommartin-Dampierre
51212	51320	Dommartin-Lettrée
51213	51800	Dommartin-sous-Hans
51214	51330	Dommartin-Varimont
51215	51300	Dompremy
51216	51490	Dontrien
51217	51700	Dormans
51219	51290	Drosnay
51220	51300	Drouilly
51222	51800	Éclaires
51223	51290	Écollemont
51224	51300	Écriennes
51225	51500	Écueil
51226	51230	Écury-le-Repos
51227	51240	Écury-sur-Coole
51228	51800	Élise-Daucourt
51229	51330	Épense
51230	51200	Épernay
51231	51460	L'Épine
51232	51490	Époye
51233	51310	Escardes
51234	51260	Esclavolles-Lurey
51235	51120	Les Essarts-lès-Sézanne
51236	51310	Les Essarts-le-Vicomte
51237	51310	Esternay
51238	51270	Étoges
51239	51130	Étréchy
51240	51340	Étrepy
51241	51230	Euvy
51242	51510	Fagnières
51243	51230	Faux-Fresnay
51244	51320	Faux-Vésigneul
51245	51170	Faverolles-et-Coëmy
51246	51300	Favresse
51247	51270	Fèrebrianges
51248	51230	Fère-Champenoise
51249	51700	Festigny
51250	51170	Fismes
51251	51190	Flavigny
51252	51480	Fleury-la-Rivière
51253	51800	Florent-en-Argonne
51254	51120	Fontaine-Denis-Nuisy
51255	51800	Fontaine-en-Dormois
51256	51160	Fontaine-sur-Ay
51258	51120	La Forestière
51259	51240	Francheville
51260	51240	Le Fresne
51262	51300	Frignicourt
51263	51210	Fromentières
51264	51210	Le Gault-Soigny
51265	51120	Gaye
51266	51160	Germaine
51267	51390	Germigny
51268	51130	Germinon
51269	51290	Giffaumont-Champaubert
51270	51290	Gigny-Bussy
51272	51330	Givry-en-Argonne
51273	51130	Givry-lès-Loisy
51274	51800	Gizaucourt
51275	51300	Glannes
51276	51230	Gourgançon
51278	51400	Les Grandes-Loges
51279	51260	Granges-sur-Aube
51280	51800	Gratreuil
51281	51190	Grauves
51282	51390	Gueux
51283	51800	Hans
51284	51300	Haussignémont
51285	51320	Haussimont
51286	51290	Hauteville
51287	51160	Hautvillers
51288	51300	Heiltz-le-Hutier
51289	51340	Heiltz-le-Maurupt
51290	51340	Heiltz-l'Évêque
51291	51220	Hermonville
51292	51460	Herpont
51293	51110	Heutrégiville
51294	51140	Hourges
51295	51300	Huiron
51296	51320	Humbauville
51298	51700	Igny-Comblizy
51299	51110	Isles-sur-Suippe
51300	51290	Isle-sur-Marne
51301	51150	Isse
51302	51190	Les Istres-et-Bury
51303	51150	Jâlons
51304	51210	Janvilliers
51305	51390	Janvry
51306	51310	Joiselle
51307	51600	Jonchery-sur-Suippe
51308	51140	Jonchery-sur-Vesle
51309	51700	Jonquery
51310	51390	Jouy-lès-Reims
51311	51340	Jussecourt-Minecourt
51312	51150	Juvigny
51313	51120	Lachy
51314	51170	Lagery
51315	51290	Landricourt
51316	51290	Larzicourt
51317	51600	Laval-sur-Tourbe
51318	51110	Lavannes
51319	51230	Lenharrée
51320	51700	Leuvrigny
51321	51170	Lhéry
51322	51290	Lignon
51323	51230	Linthelles
51324	51230	Linthes
51325	51300	Lisse-en-Champagne
51326	51400	Livry-Louvercy
51327	51130	Loisy-en-Brie
51328	51300	Loisy-sur-Marne
51329	51220	Loivre
51333	51500	Ludes
51334	51300	Luxémont-et-Villotte

INSEE code	Postal code	Commune
51336	51800	Maffrécourt
51663	51530	Magenta
51337	51170	Magneux
51338	51500	Mailly-Champagne
51339	51240	Mairy-sur-Marne
51340	51300	Maisons-en-Champagne
51341	51800	Malmy
51342	51530	Mancy
51343	51260	Marcilly-sur-Seine
51344	51530	Mardeuil
51345	51270	Mareuil-en-Brie
51346	51700	Mareuil-le-Port
51348	51170	Marfaux
51349	51290	Margerie-Hancourt
51350	51210	Margny
51351	51230	Marigny
51352	51300	Marolles
51353	51260	Marsangis
51354	51240	Marson
51355	51800	Massiges
51356	51300	Matignicourt-Goncourt
51357	51510	Matougues
51358	51340	Maurupt-le-Montois
51359	51210	Mécringes
51360	51120	Le Meix-Saint-Epoing
51361	51320	Le Meix-Tiercelin
51362	51220	Merfy
51363	51300	Merlaut
51364	51390	Méry-Prémecy
51365	51370	Les Mesneux
51367	51190	Le Mesnil-sur-Oger
51368	51800	Minaucourt-le-Mesnil-lès-Hurlus
51369	51120	Mœurs-Verdey
51370	51800	Moiremont
51371	51240	Moivre
51373	51290	Moncetz-l'Abbaye
51372	51470	Moncetz-Longevas
51374	51120	Mondement-Montgivroux
51375	51500	Montbré
51377	51320	Montépreux
51376	51260	Montgenost
51378	51530	Monthelon
51379	51140	Montigny-sur-Vesle
51380	51210	Montmirail
51381	51270	Montmort-Lucy
51382	51170	Mont-sur-Courville
51384	51530	Morangis
51386	51210	Morsains
51387	51530	Moslins
51388	51400	Mourmelon-le-Grand
51389	51400	Mourmelon-le-Petit
51390	51530	Moussy
51391	51140	Muizon
51392	51160	Mutigny
51393	51480	Nanteuil-la-Forêt
51395	51120	Nesle-la-Reposte
51396	51700	Nesle-le-Repons
51399	51800	La Neuville-au-Pont
51485	51400	La Neuville-au-Temple
51397	51330	La Neuville-aux-Bois
51398	51480	La Neuville-aux-Larris
51402	51310	Neuvy
51403	51420	Nogent-l'Abbesse
51404	51330	Noirlieu
51406	51300	Norrois
51407	51310	La Noue
51409	51240	Nuisement-sur-Coole
51410	51480	Œuilly
51412	51230	Ognes
51413	51530	Oiry
51414	51700	Olizy
51415	51240	Omey
51416	51270	Orbais-l'Abbaye
51417	51300	Orconte
51418	51370	Ormes
51419	51290	Outines
51420	51300	Outrepont
51421	51120	Oyes
51422	51390	Pargny-lès-Reims
51423	51340	Pargny-sur-Saulx
51424	51800	Passavant-en-Argonne
51425	51700	Passy-Grigny
51426	51120	Péas
51428	51400	Les Petites-Loges
51429	51140	Pévy
51430	51130	Pierre-Morains
51431	51530	Pierry
51432	51230	Pleurs
51433	51300	Plichancourt
51434	51150	Plivot
51435	51130	Pocancy
51436	51240	Pogny
51437	51170	Poilly
51438	51460	Poix
51439	51110	Pomacle
51440	51490	Pontfaverger-Moronvilliers
51441	51300	Ponthion
51442	51330	Possesse
51443	51260	Potangis
51444	51220	Pouillon
51445	51480	Pourcy
51446	51300	Pringy
51447	51400	Prosnes
51448	51140	Prouilly
51449	51360	Prunay
51450	51500	Puisieulx
51451	51120	Queudes
51452	51330	Rapsécourt
51453	51520	Recy
51454	51100	Reims
51455	51300	Reims-la-Brûlée
51456	51330	Remicourt
51458	51120	Reuves
51459	51310	Réveillon
51460	51210	Rieux
51461	51500	Rilly-la-Montagne
51463	51300	Les Rivières-Henruel
51464	51140	Romain
51465	51480	Romery
51466	51170	Romigny
51468	51390	Rosnay
51469	51130	Rouffy
51470	51800	Rouvroy-Ripont
51471	51500	Sacy
51472	51300	Saint-Amand-sur-Fion
51473	51310	Saint-Bon
51474	51370	Saint-Brice-Courcelles
51475	51290	Saint-Chéron
51480	51700	Sainte-Gemme
51501	51600	Sainte-Marie-à-Py
51277	51290	Sainte-Marie-du-Lac-Nuisement
51507	51800	Sainte-Menehould
51476	51460	Saint-Étienne-au-Temple
51477	51110	Saint-Étienne-sur-Suippe
51478	52100	Saint-Eulien
51479	51390	Saint-Euphraise-et-Clairizet
51482	51240	Saint-Germain-la-Ville
51483	51510	Saint-Gibrien
51484	51170	Saint-Gilles
51486	51600	Saint-Hilaire-le-Grand
51487	51490	Saint-Hilaire-le-Petit
51488	51160	Saint-Imoges
51489	51330	Saint-Jean-devant-Possesse
51490	51240	Saint-Jean-sur-Moivre
51491	51600	Saint-Jean-sur-Tourbe
51492	51260	Saint-Just-Sauvage
51493	51500	Saint-Léonard
51495	51120	Saint-Loup
51496	51300	Saint-Lumier-en-Champagne
51497	51340	Saint-Lumier-la-Populeuse
51499	51130	Saint-Mard-lès-Rouffy
51498	51800	Saint-Mard-sur-Auve
51500	51330	Saint-Mard-sur-le-Mont
51502	51240	Saint-Martin-aux-Champs
51002	51530	Saint-Martin-d'Ablois
51503	51490	Saint-Martin-l'Heureux
51504	51520	Saint-Martin-sur-le-Pré
51505	51490	Saint-Masmes
51506	51470	Saint-Memmie
51508	51320	Saint-Ouen-Domprot
51509	51510	Saint-Pierre
51510	51300	Saint-Quentin-les-Marais
51511	51120	Saint-Quentin-le-Verger
51512	51240	Saint-Quentin-sur-Coole
51513	51290	Saint-Remy-en-Bouzemont-Saint-Genest-et-Isson
51514	51120	Saint-Remy-sous-Broyes
51515	51600	Saint-Remy-sur-Bussy
51516	51260	Saint-Saturnin
51517	51600	Saint-Souplet-sur-Py
51518	51220	Saint-Thierry
51519	51800	Saint-Thomas-en-Argonne
51520	51290	Saint-Utin
51521	51340	Saint-Vrain
51522	52100	Sapignicourt
51523	51170	Sarcy
51524	51260	Saron-sur-Aube
51525	51520	Sarry
51526	51120	Saudoy
51527	51170	Savigny-sur-Ardres
51528	51340	Scrupt
51529	51490	Selles
51530	51400	Sept-Saulx
51531	51250	Sermaize-les-Bains
51532	51500	Sermiers
51533	51800	Servon-Melzicourt
51534	51170	Serzy-et-Prin
51535	51120	Sézanne
51536	51500	Sillery
51537	51800	Sivry-Ante
51538	51520	Sogny-aux-Moulins
51539	51340	Sogny-en-l'Angle
51542	51120	Soizy-aux-Bois
51543	51800	Somme-Bionne
51544	51600	Sommepy-Tahure
51545	51320	Sommesous
51546	51600	Somme-Suippe
51547	51600	Somme-Tourbe
51548	51460	Somme-Vesle
51549	51330	Somme-Yèvre
51550	51320	Sompuis
51551	51290	Somsois
51552	51240	Songy
51553	51600	Souain-Perthes-lès-Hurlus
51555	51320	Soudé
51556	51320	Soudron
51557	51300	Soulanges
51558	51130	Soulières
51559	51600	Suippes
51560	51270	Suizy-le-Franc
51562	51500	Taissy
51563	51270	Talus-Saint-Prix
51565	51230	Thaas
51566	51510	Thibie
51567	51300	Thiéblemont-Farémont
51568	51220	Thil
51569	51370	Thillois
51570	51210	Le Thoult-Trosnay
51572	51460	Tilloy-et-Bellay
51573	51430	Tinqueux
51574	51240	Togny-aux-Bœufs
51576	51150	Tours-sur-Marne
51577	51170	Tramery
51578	51130	Trécon
51579	51210	Tréfols
51580	51380	Trépail
51581	51140	Treslon
51582	51140	Trigny
51583	51340	Trois-Fontaines-l'Abbaye
51584	51500	Trois-Puits
51585	51700	Troissy
51586	51170	Unchair
51587	51400	Vadenay
51564	51150	Val-de-Livre
51158	51130	Val-des-Marais
51571	51360	Val-de-Vesle
51218	51340	Val-de-Vière
51588	51800	Valmy
51589	51330	Vanault-le-Châtel
51590	51340	Vanault-les-Dames
51591	51140	Vandeuil
51592	51700	Vandières
51594	51320	Vassimont-et-Chapelaine
51595	51320	Vatry
51596	51210	Vauchamps
51597	51480	Vauciennes
51598	51300	Vauclerc
51599	51380	Vaudemange
51600	51600	Vaudesincourt
51601	51300	Vavray-le-Grand
51602	51300	Vavray-le-Petit
51603	51130	Vélye
51604	51140	Ventelay
51605	51480	Venteuil
51607	51210	Verdon
51608	51330	Vernancourt
51609	51700	Verneuil
51610	51800	Verrières
51611	51130	Vert-Toulon
51613	51360	Verzenay
51614	51380	Verzy
51616	51240	Vésigneul-sur-Marne
51617	51520	La Veuve
51618	51210	Le Vézier
51619	51330	Le Vieil-Dampierre
51620	51800	Vienne-la-Ville
51621	51800	Vienne-le-Château
51622	51390	Ville-Dommange
51623	51500	Ville-en-Selve
51624	51170	Ville-en-Tardenois
51625	51310	Villeneuve-la-Lionne
51626	51120	La Villeneuve-lès-Charleville
51627	51130	Villeneuve-Renneville-Chevigny
51628	51120	Villeneuve-Saint-Vistre-et-Villevotte
51629	51500	Villers-Allerand
51630	51130	Villers-aux-Bois
51631	51500	Villers-aux-Nœuds
51632	51800	Villers-en-Argonne
51633	51220	Villers-Franqueux
51634	51510	Villers-le-Château
51635	51250	Villers-le-Sec
51636	51380	Villers-Marmery
51638	51130	Villeseneux
51639	51270	La Ville-sous-Orbais
51640	51800	Ville-sur-Tourbe
51641	51270	Villevenard
51642	51260	Villiers-aux-Corneilles
51643	51530	Vinay
51644	51700	Vincelles
51645	51120	Vindey
51646	51800	Virginy
51647	51300	Vitry-en-Perthois
51648	51240	Vitry-la-Ville
51649	51300	Vitry-le-François
51650	51800	Voilemont
51652	51260	Vouarces
51654	51340	Vouillers
51655	51130	Vouzy
51656	51150	Vraux
51657	51390	Vrigny
51658	51330	Vroil
51659	51800	Wargemoulin-Hurlus
51660	51110	Warmeriville
51662	51420	Witry-lès-Reims
