= Les Rivières-Henruel =

- Commune
- Coat of arms
- Location of Les Rivières-Henruel
- Location within France Location within Grand Est
- Coordinates: 48°39′17″N 4°33′53″E
- Country: France
- Region: Grand Est
- Department: Marne
- Arrondissement: Vitry-le-François
- Canton: Vitry-le-François-Champagne et Der

Government
  - Mayor (2020–2026): Patrick Champion
- Area^{1}: 11.97 km^{2} (4.62 sq mi)
- Elevation: 120 m (390 ft)
- Population (2023): 156
  - Density: 13.0/km^{2} (33.8/sq mi)
- Time zone: UTC+01:00 (CET)
  - Summer (DST): UTC+02:00 (CEST)
- INSEE/Postal code: 51463 /51300
- ^{1} French Land Register data, which excludes lakes, ponds, glaciers > 1 km^{2} (0.386 sq mi or 247 acres) and river estuaries.

Les Rivières-Henruel (French pronunciation: [le ʁivjɛʁ ɑ̃ʁɥɛl]) is a commune in the Marne department in the Grand Est region in north-eastern France.

== See also ==
- Communes of the Marne department
