= Saint-Chéron, Marne =

Saint-Chéron
- Commune
- Location of Saint-Chéron
- Location within France Location within Grand Est
- Coordinates: 48°38′13″N 4°33′41″E
- Country: France
- Region: Grand Est
- Department: Marne
- Arrondissement: Vitry-le-François
- Canton: Vitry-le-François-Champagne et Der

Government
  - Mayor (2020–2026): Marylène Simonnet
- Area^{1}: 9.16 km^{2} (3.54 sq mi)
- Elevation: 151 m (495 ft)
- Population (2023): 63
  - Density: 6.9/km^{2} (18/sq mi)
- Time zone: UTC+01:00 (CET)
  - Summer (DST): UTC+02:00 (CEST)
- INSEE/Postal code: 51475 /51290
- ^{1} French Land Register data, which excludes lakes, ponds, glaciers > 1 km^{2} (0.386 sq mi or 247 acres) and river estuaries.

Saint-Chéron (French pronunciation: [sɛ̃ ʃeʁɔ̃]) is a commune in the Marne department in north-eastern France.

== See also ==
- Communes of the Marne department
