= Arrondissement of Vitry-le-François =

Coordinates: 48°43′N 4°35′E

Vitry-le-François
- Arrondissement
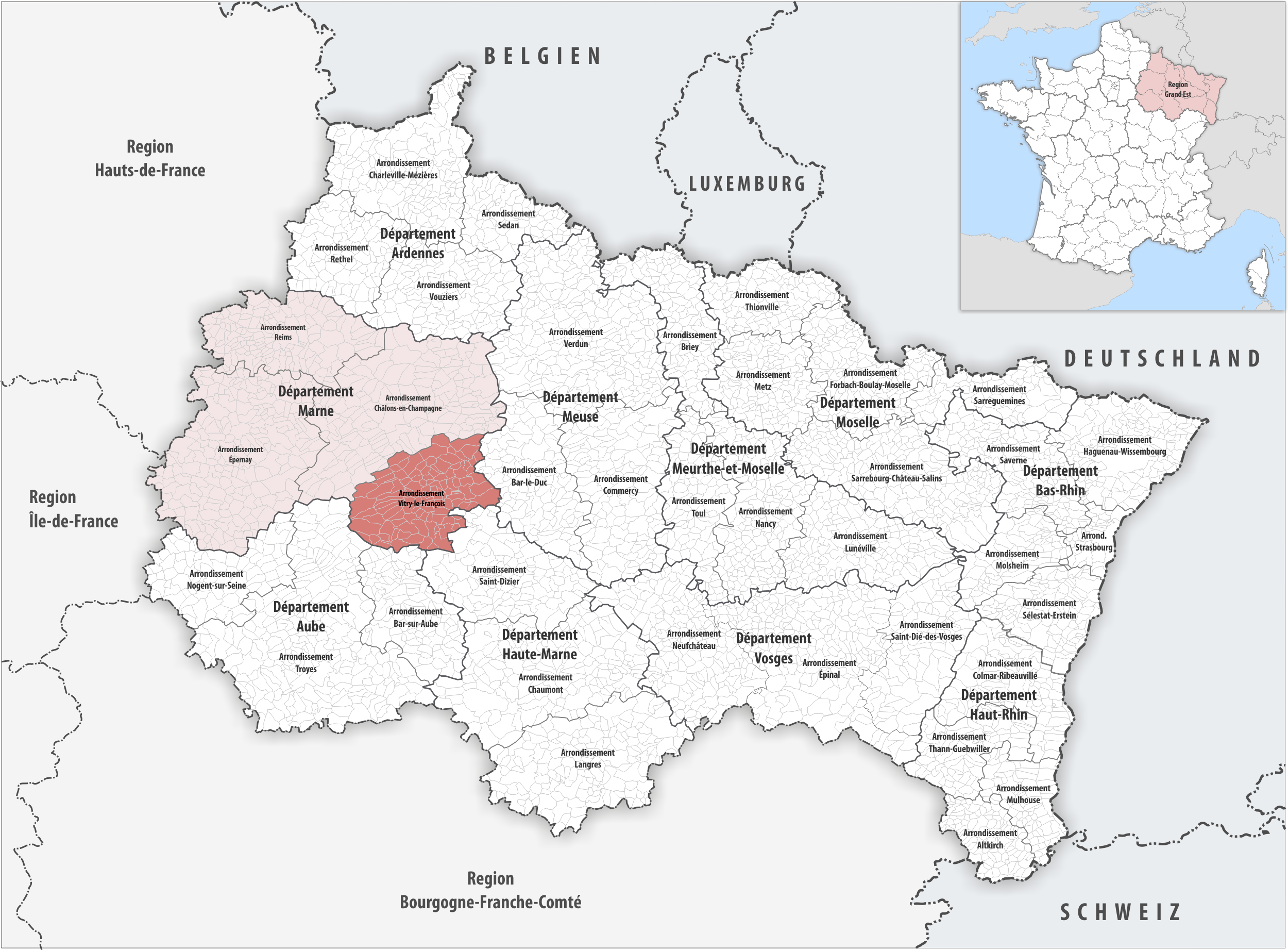
- Location within the region Grand Est
- Country: France
- Region: Grand Est
- Department: Marne
- No. of communes: {{{nbcomm}}}
- Area: 1,402.0 km^{2} (541.3 sq mi)
- Population (2023): 42,965
  - Density: 30.646/km^{2} (79.371/sq mi)
- INSEE code: 514

The arrondissement of Vitry-le-François is an arrondissement of France in the Marne department in the Grand Est region. It has 110 communes. Its population is 43,836 (2021), and its area is 1,402.0 km^{2} (541.3 sq mi).

== Composition ==
The 110 communes of the arrondissement of Vitry-le-François, and their INSEE codes, are:

- Ablancourt (51001)
- Alliancelles (51006)
- Ambrières (51008)
- Arrigny (51016)
- Arzillières-Neuville (51017)
- Aulnay-l'Aître (51022)
- Bassu (51039)
- Bassuet (51040)
- Bettancourt-la-Longue (51057)
- Bignicourt-sur-Marne (51059)
- Bignicourt-sur-Saulx (51060)
- Blacy (51065)
- Blaise-sous-Arzillières (51066)
- Blesme (51068)
- Brandonvillers (51080)
- Bréban (51084)
- Brusson (51094)
- Le Buisson (51095)
- Bussy-le-Repos (51098)
- Changy (51122)
- Chapelaine (51125)
- Charmont (51130)
- Châtelraould-Saint-Louvent (51134)
- Châtillon-sur-Broué (51135)
- La Chaussée-sur-Marne (51141)
- Cheminon (51144)
- Cloyes-sur-Marne (51156)
- Coole (51167)
- Corbeil (51169)
- Courdemanges (51184)
- Couvrot (51195)
- Dompremy (51215)
- Drosnay (51219)
- Drouilly (51220)
- Écollemont (51223)
- Écriennes (51224)
- Étrepy (51240)
- Favresse (51246)
- Frignicourt (51262)
- Giffaumont-Champaubert (51269)
- Gigny-Bussy (51270)
- Glannes (51275)
- Haussignémont (51284)
- Hauteville (51286)
- Heiltz-le-Hutier (51288)
- Heiltz-le-Maurupt (51289)
- Heiltz-l'Évêque (51290)
- Huiron (51295)
- Humbauville (51296)
- Isle-sur-Marne (51300)
- Jussecourt-Minecourt (51311)
- Landricourt (51315)
- Larzicourt (51316)
- Lignon (51322)
- Lisse-en-Champagne (51325)
- Loisy-sur-Marne (51328)
- Luxémont-et-Villotte (51334)
- Maisons-en-Champagne (51340)
- Margerie-Hancourt (51349)
- Marolles (51352)
- Matignicourt-Goncourt (51356)
- Maurupt-le-Montois (51358)
- Le Meix-Tiercelin (51361)
- Merlaut (51363)
- Moncetz-l'Abbaye (51373)
- Norrois (51406)
- Orconte (51417)
- Outines (51419)
- Outrepont (51420)
- Pargny-sur-Saulx (51423)
- Plichancourt (51433)
- Ponthion (51441)
- Possesse (51442)
- Pringy (51446)
- Reims-la-Brûlée (51455)
- Les Rivières-Henruel (51463)
- Saint-Amand-sur-Fion (51472)
- Saint-Chéron (51475)
- Sainte-Marie-du-Lac-Nuisement (51277)
- Saint-Eulien (51478)
- Saint-Jean-devant-Possesse (51489)
- Saint-Lumier-en-Champagne (51496)
- Saint-Lumier-la-Populeuse (51497)
- Saint-Ouen-Domprot (51508)
- Saint-Quentin-les-Marais (51510)
- Saint-Remy-en-Bouzemont-
  Saint-Genest-et-Isson (51513)
- Saint-Utin (51520)
- Saint-Vrain (51521)
- Sapignicourt (51522)
- Scrupt (51528)
- Sermaize-les-Bains (51531)
- Sogny-en-l'Angle (51539)
- Sompuis (51550)
- Somsois (51551)
- Songy (51552)
- Soulanges (51557)
- Thiéblemont-Farémont (51567)
- Trois-Fontaines-l'Abbaye (51583)
- Val-de-Vière (51218)
- Vanault-le-Châtel (51589)
- Vanault-les-Dames (51590)
- Vauclerc (51598)
- Vavray-le-Grand (51601)
- Vavray-le-Petit (51602)
- Vernancourt (51608)
- Villers-le-Sec (51635)
- Vitry-en-Perthois (51647)
- Vitry-le-François (51649)
- Vouillers (51654)
- Vroil (51658)

== History ==
The arrondissement of Vitry-le-François was created in 1800. At the April 2017 reorganisation of the arrondissements of Marne, it lost three communes to the arrondissement of Châlons-en-Champagne.

As a result of the reorganisation of the cantons of France which came into effect in 2015, the borders of the cantons are no longer related to the borders of the arrondissements. The six cantons of the arrondissement of Vitry-le-François were, as of January 2015:

- Heiltz-le-Maurupt
- Saint-Remy-en-Bouzemont-Saint-Genest-et-Isson
- Sompuis
- Thiéblemont-Farémont
- Vitry-le-François-Est
- Vitry-le-François-Ouest
