= Chapelaine =

- Commune
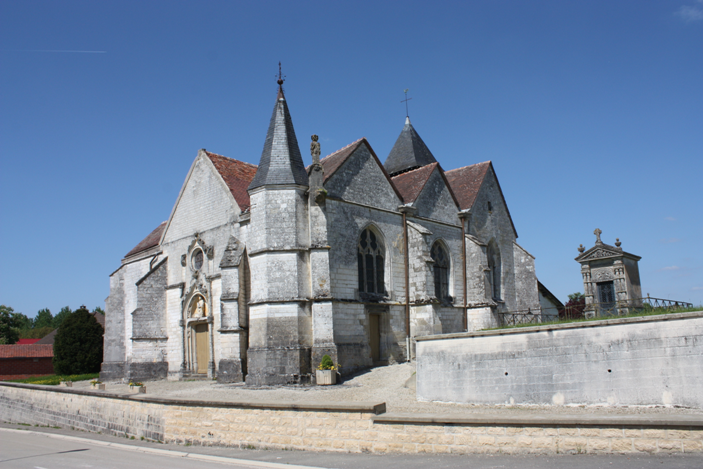
- The church in Chapelaine
- Location of Chapelaine
- Location within France Location within Grand Est
- Coordinates: 48°34′47″N 4°29′55″E
- Country: France
- Region: Grand Est
- Department: Marne
- Arrondissement: Vitry-le-François
- Canton: Vitry-le-François-Champagne et Der
- Intercommunality: CC Vitry, Champagne et Der

Government
  - Mayor (2020–2026): Philippe Dhyèvre
- Area^{1}: 9.19 km^{2} (3.55 sq mi)
- Elevation: 140 m (460 ft)
- Population (2023): 45
  - Density: 4.9/km^{2} (13/sq mi)
- Time zone: UTC+01:00 (CET)
  - Summer (DST): UTC+02:00 (CEST)
- INSEE/Postal code: 51125 /51290
- ^{1} French Land Register data, which excludes lakes, ponds, glaciers > 1 km^{2} (0.386 sq mi or 247 acres) and river estuaries.

Chapelaine (French pronunciation: [ʃaplɛn]) is a commune in the Marne department in north-eastern France.

== See also ==
- Communes of the Marne department
