= Châtelraould-Saint-Louvent =

- Commune
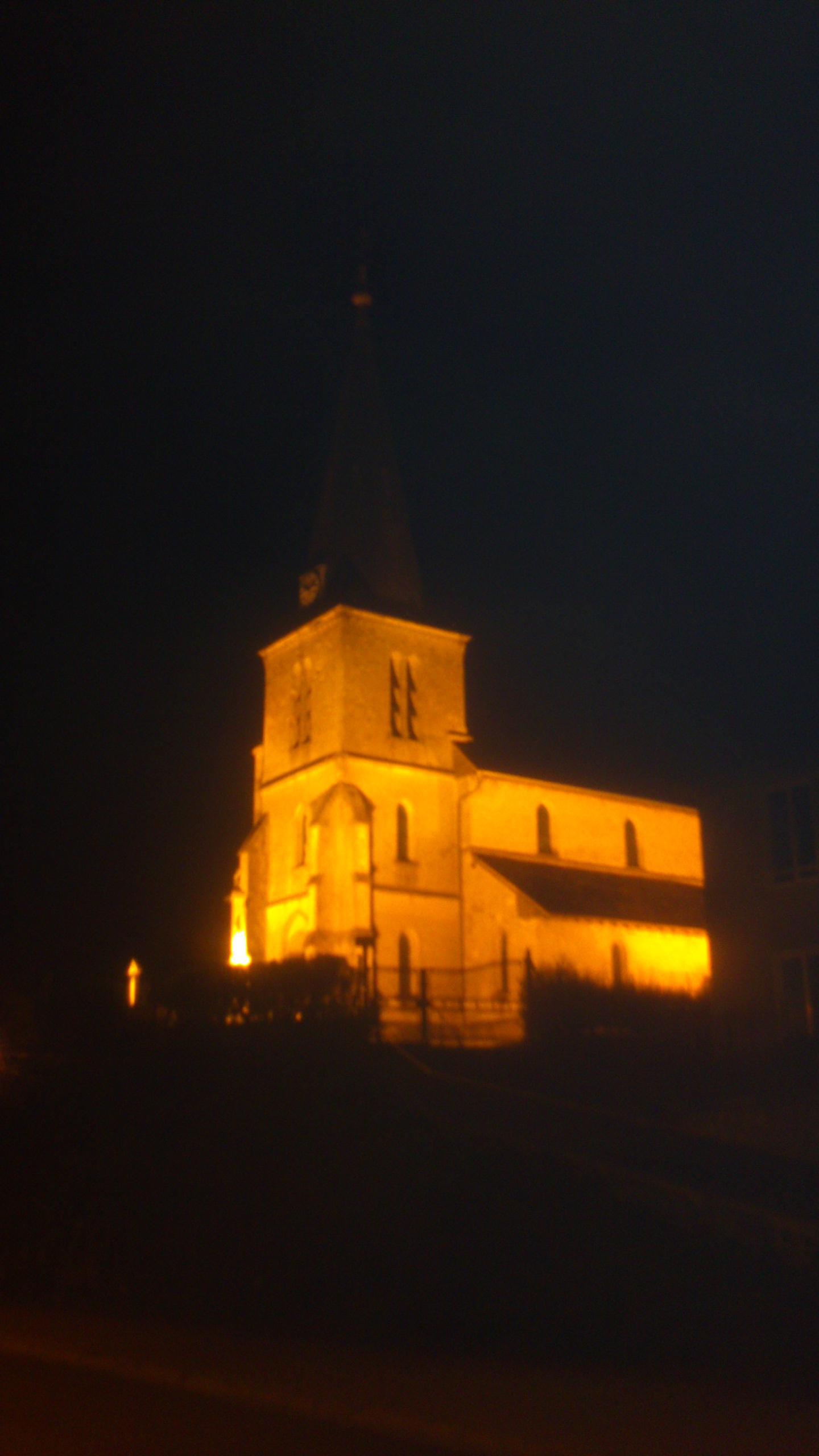
- The church in Châtelraould
- Location of Châtelraould-Saint-Louvent
- Location within France Location within Grand Est
- Coordinates: 48°40′46″N 4°32′49″E
- Country: France
- Region: Grand Est
- Department: Marne
- Arrondissement: Vitry-le-François
- Canton: Vitry-le-François-Champagne et Der
- Intercommunality: Vitry, Champagne et Der

Government
  - Mayor (2020–2026): Claude Thiebault
- Area^{1}: 16.91 km^{2} (6.53 sq mi)
- Elevation: 112 m (367 ft)
- Population (2023): 244
  - Density: 14.4/km^{2} (37.4/sq mi)
- Time zone: UTC+01:00 (CET)
  - Summer (DST): UTC+02:00 (CEST)
- INSEE/Postal code: 51134 /51300
- ^{1} French Land Register data, which excludes lakes, ponds, glaciers > 1 km^{2} (0.386 sq mi or 247 acres) and river estuaries.

Châtelraould-Saint-Louvent is a commune in the Marne department in north-eastern France.

== See also ==
- Communes of the Marne department
