= Vitry-le-François =

- Subprefecture and commune
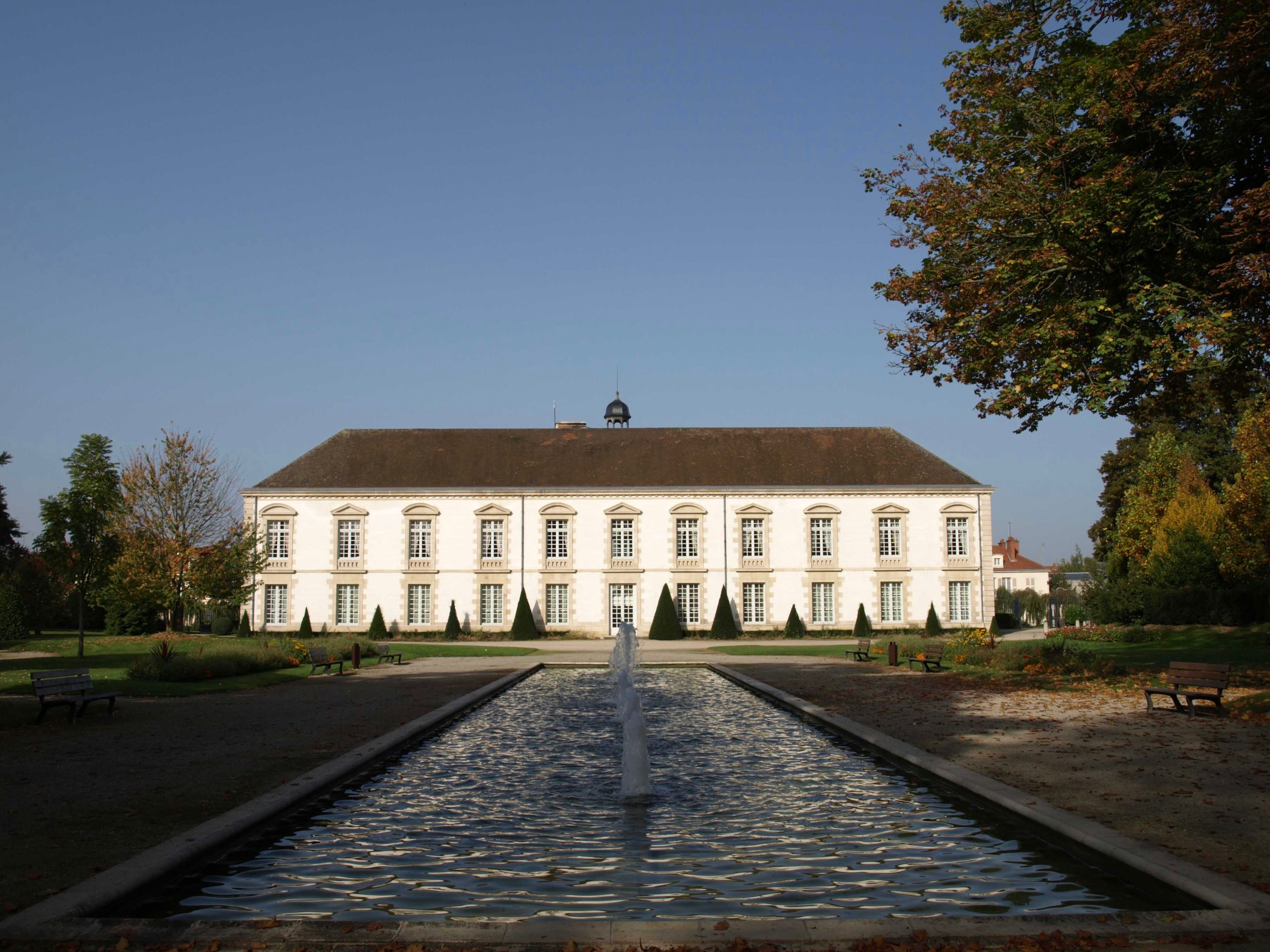
- The town hall in Vitry-le-François

- Coat of arms
- Location of Vitry-le-François
- Location within France Location within Grand Est
- Coordinates: 48°43′32″N 4°35′07″E
- Country: France
- Region: Grand Est
- Department: Marne
- Arrondissement: Vitry-le-François
- Canton: Vitry-le-François-Champagne et Der
- Intercommunality: Vitry, Champagne et Der

Government
  - Mayor (2020–2026): Jean-Pierre Bouquet
- Area^{1}: 6.45 km^{2} (2.49 sq mi)
- Elevation: 105 m (344 ft)
- Population (2023): 10,996
  - Density: 1,700/km^{2} (4,420/sq mi)
- Time zone: UTC+01:00 (CET)
  - Summer (DST): UTC+02:00 (CEST)
- INSEE/Postal code: 51649 /51300
- ^{1} French Land Register data, which excludes lakes, ponds, glaciers > 1 km^{2} (0.386 sq mi or 247 acres) and river estuaries.

Vitry-le-François (French pronunciation: [vitʁi lə fʁɑ̃swa]) is a commune in the Marne department in northeastern France. It is located on the river Marne and is the western terminus of the Marne–Rhine Canal. Vitry-le-François station has rail connections to Paris, Reims, Strasbourg, Metz, Dijon and several regional destinations.

== History ==
The present town is a relatively recent construction, having been built in 1545 at the behest of King Francis who wished to replace Vitry-en-Perthois on a new site 2.5 miles to the South-West, which had been entirely destroyed in 1544 by the forces of Holy Roman Emperor Charles V during the Italian War of 1542–46. The new Vitry was to be a modern city, constructed according to a plan produced by Girolamo Marini. The king's role in its creation resulted in Vitry-le-François receiving the king's name as part of its own name.

At the beginning of World War I in August 1914, Joseph Joffre established the Grand Quartier Général at the Place Royer-Collard.

In 1961, a terrorist attack took place on a train going between Strasbourg and Paris.

== Demography ==
Historical population

Year	Pop.	±% p.a.
1793	7,385	—
1800	6,925	−0.91%
1806	7,194	+0.64%
1821	6,909	−0.27%
1831	6,976	+0.10%
1836	6,822	−0.45%
1841	7,749	+2.58%
1846	7,412	−0.89%
1851	7,795	+1.01%
1856	7,151	−1.71%
1861	7,263	+0.31%
1866	7,431	+0.46%
1872	6,898	−1.23%
1876	7,616	+2.51%
1881	7,760	+0.38%
1886	7,670	−0.23%
1891	8,022	+0.90%
1896	8,400	+0.93%
1901	8,561	+0.38%

Year	Pop.	±% p.a.
1906	8,487	−0.17%
1911	8,511	+0.06%
1921	8,568	+0.07%
1926	8,876	+0.71%
1931	9,082	+0.46%
1936	9,061	−0.05%
1946	7,584	−1.76%
1954	11,131	+4.91%
1962	14,795	+3.62%
1968	16,879	+2.22%
1975	19,372	+1.99%
1982	18,261	−0.84%
1990	17,033	−0.87%
1999	16,737	−0.19%
2007	14,873	−1.47%
2012	13,065	−2.56%
2017	12,133	−1.47%
2023	10,996	−1.63%

Source: EHESS and INSEE

== Features ==
- Its church of Notre-Dame is a 17th-century building with fine 18th-century monuments.
- A convent of the Récollets was later converted to contain the town hall, the court-house, a library and a small museum.
- There is a bronze statue of Pierre Paul Royer-Collard (1763–1845), the politician and philosopher, a native of the district.

== Twin towns ==
Vitry-le-François is twinned with:

- Tauberbischofsheim, Germany, since 1961

== Notable people ==
- René Gateaux (1889–1914), mathematician
- Guy Georges (born 1962), serial killer
- René Herbin (1911–1953), classical pianist
- Abraham de Moivre (1667–1754), mathematician
- Daniel Demoivre (fl. 1695-1731), musician
- Étienne-Gabriel Morelly (1717–1778), proto-communist philosopher
- Mary de Vitry, person executed for their gender identity
- Simhah ben Samuel of Vitry (fl. c. 1100), Talmudist

== Climate ==
Climate data for Vitry-le-François (Frignicourt) (1991–2020 normals, extremes 1974–present)
Month	Jan	Feb	Mar	Apr	May	Jun	Jul	Aug	Sep	Oct	Nov	Dec	Year
Record high °C (°F)	16.6 (61.9)	21.1 (70.0)	26.0 (78.8)	29.1 (84.4)	34.0 (93.2)	37.1 (98.8)	41.7 (107.1)	40.3 (104.5)	34.5 (94.1)	29.4 (84.9)	23.3 (73.9)	17.7 (63.9)	41.7 (107.1)
Mean daily maximum °C (°F)	6.5 (43.7)	7.9 (46.2)	12.3 (54.1)	16.3 (61.3)	20.1 (68.2)	23.5 (74.3)	26.1 (79.0)	25.9 (78.6)	21.5 (70.7)	16.3 (61.3)	10.3 (50.5)	7.0 (44.6)	16.1 (61.0)
Daily mean °C (°F)	3.7 (38.7)	4.4 (39.9)	7.6 (45.7)	10.7 (51.3)	14.6 (58.3)	17.7 (63.9)	19.9 (67.8)	19.7 (67.5)	15.9 (60.6)	12.0 (53.6)	7.2 (45.0)	4.4 (39.9)	11.5 (52.7)
Mean daily minimum °C (°F)	0.9 (33.6)	0.9 (33.6)	2.9 (37.2)	5.1 (41.2)	9.0 (48.2)	11.9 (53.4)	13.7 (56.7)	13.5 (56.3)	10.2 (50.4)	7.6 (45.7)	4.1 (39.4)	1.7 (35.1)	6.8 (44.2)
Record low °C (°F)	−22.0 (−7.6)	−14.8 (5.4)	−11.1 (12.0)	−4.9 (23.2)	−1.5 (29.3)	2.3 (36.1)	5.3 (41.5)	4.1 (39.4)	1.0 (33.8)	−3.9 (25.0)	−10.7 (12.7)	−16.0 (3.2)	−22.0 (−7.6)
Average precipitation mm (inches)	55.9 (2.20)	51.3 (2.02)	50.5 (1.99)	47.1 (1.85)	62.1 (2.44)	53.3 (2.10)	59.0 (2.32)	58.9 (2.32)	57.3 (2.26)	65.5 (2.58)	60.0 (2.36)	73.7 (2.90)	694.6 (27.35)
Average precipitation days (≥ 1.0 mm)	11.2	10.4	10.1	8.7	10.1	9.2	8.2	7.7	8.2	10.3	11.2	12.3	117.7
Source: Meteociel

== See also ==
- Communes of the Marne department
- Champagne Riots
- French wine
- 1961 Vitry-Le-François train bombing
- François I school complex
