= Frignicourt =

- Commune
- Location of Frignicourt
- Location within France Location within Grand Est
- Coordinates: 48°42′06″N 4°35′24″E
- Country: France
- Region: Grand Est
- Department: Marne
- Arrondissement: Vitry-le-François
- Canton: Vitry-le-François-Champagne et Der
- Intercommunality: Vitry, Champagne et Der

Government
  - Mayor (2022–2026): Annick Felicetti
- Area^{1}: 9.7 km^{2} (3.7 sq mi)
- Elevation: 103 m (338 ft)
- Population (2023): 1,747
  - Density: 180/km^{2} (470/sq mi)
- Time zone: UTC+01:00 (CET)
  - Summer (DST): UTC+02:00 (CEST)
- INSEE/Postal code: 51262 /51300
- ^{1} French Land Register data, which excludes lakes, ponds, glaciers > 1 km^{2} (0.386 sq mi or 247 acres) and river estuaries.

Frignicourt (French pronunciation: [fʁiɲikuʁ]) is a commune in the Marne department in northeastern France.

== Climate ==
On average, Frignicourt experiences 53.6 days per year with a minimum temperature below 0 °C (32.0 °F), 1.0 days per year with a minimum temperature below −10 °C (14.0 °F), 5.5 days per year with a maximum temperature below 0 °C (32.0 °F), and 16.2 days per year with a maximum temperature above 30 °C (86.0 °F). The record high temperature was 41.7 °C (107.1 °F) on July 25, 2019, while the record low temperature was −22.0 °C (−7.6 °F) on January 9, 1985.

Climate data for Frignicourt (1991–2020 normals, extremes 1974–present)
| Month | Jan | Feb | Mar | Apr | May | Jun | Jul | Aug | Sep | Oct | Nov | Dec | Year |
|---|---|---|---|---|---|---|---|---|---|---|---|---|---|
| Record high °C (°F) | 16.6 (61.9) | 21.1 (70.0) | 26.0 (78.8) | 29.1 (84.4) | 34.0 (93.2) | 37.8 (100.0) | 41.7 (107.1) | 40.3 (104.5) | 34.5 (94.1) | 29.4 (84.9) | 23.3 (73.9) | 17.7 (63.9) | 41.7 (107.1) |
| Mean daily maximum °C (°F) | 6.5 (43.7) | 7.9 (46.2) | 12.3 (54.1) | 16.3 (61.3) | 20.1 (68.2) | 23.5 (74.3) | 26.1 (79.0) | 25.9 (78.6) | 21.5 (70.7) | 16.3 (61.3) | 10.3 (50.5) | 7.0 (44.6) | 16.1 (61.0) |
| Daily mean °C (°F) | 3.7 (38.7) | 4.4 (39.9) | 7.6 (45.7) | 10.7 (51.3) | 14.6 (58.3) | 17.7 (63.9) | 19.9 (67.8) | 19.7 (67.5) | 15.9 (60.6) | 12.0 (53.6) | 7.2 (45.0) | 4.4 (39.9) | 11.5 (52.7) |
| Mean daily minimum °C (°F) | 0.9 (33.6) | 0.9 (33.6) | 2.9 (37.2) | 5.1 (41.2) | 9.0 (48.2) | 11.9 (53.4) | 13.7 (56.7) | 13.5 (56.3) | 10.2 (50.4) | 7.6 (45.7) | 4.1 (39.4) | 1.7 (35.1) | 6.8 (44.2) |
| Record low °C (°F) | −22.0 (−7.6) | −14.8 (5.4) | −11.1 (12.0) | −4.9 (23.2) | −1.5 (29.3) | 2.3 (36.1) | 5.3 (41.5) | 4.1 (39.4) | 1.0 (33.8) | −3.9 (25.0) | −10.7 (12.7) | −16.0 (3.2) | −22.0 (−7.6) |
| Average precipitation mm (inches) | 55.9 (2.20) | 51.3 (2.02) | 50.5 (1.99) | 47.1 (1.85) | 62.1 (2.44) | 53.3 (2.10) | 59.0 (2.32) | 58.9 (2.32) | 57.3 (2.26) | 65.5 (2.58) | 60.0 (2.36) | 73.7 (2.90) | 694.6 (27.34) |
| Average precipitation days (≥ 1.0 mm) | 11.2 | 10.4 | 10.1 | 8.7 | 10.1 | 9.2 | 8.2 | 7.7 | 8.2 | 10.3 | 11.2 | 12.3 | 117.6 |
Source: Meteociel

== See also ==
- Communes of the Marne department
