= Soulanges, Marne =

Soulanges
- Commune
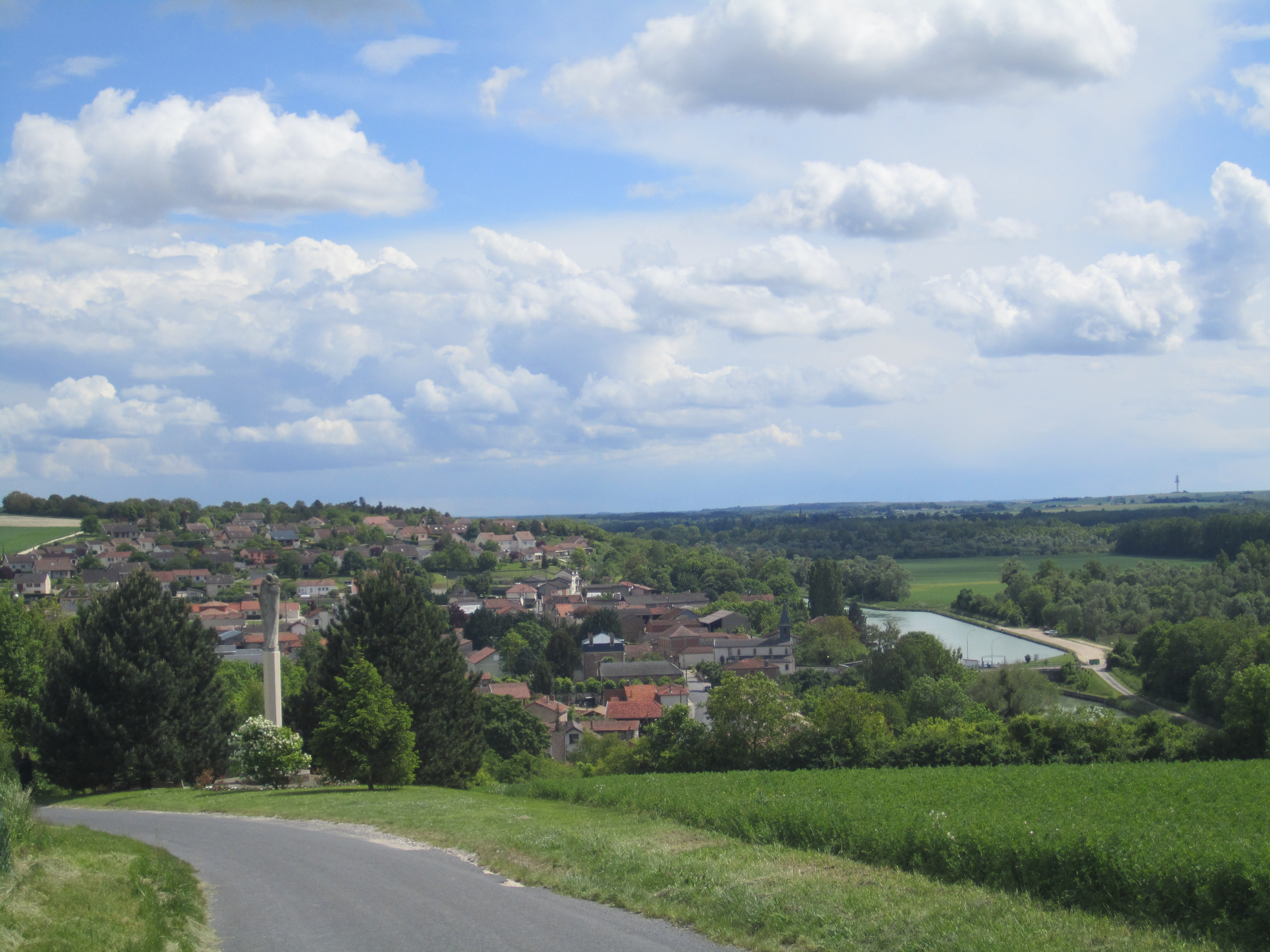
- A general view of Soulanges

- Coat of arms
- Location of Soulanges
- Location within France Location within Grand Est
- Coordinates: 48°47′29″N 4°32′09″E
- Country: France
- Region: Grand Est
- Department: Marne
- Arrondissement: Vitry-le-François
- Canton: Vitry-le-François-Champagne et Der

Government
  - Mayor (2020–2026): David Bonetti
- Area^{1}: 12.37 km^{2} (4.78 sq mi)
- Elevation: 98 m (322 ft)
- Population (2023): 453
  - Density: 36.6/km^{2} (94.8/sq mi)
- Time zone: UTC+01:00 (CET)
  - Summer (DST): UTC+02:00 (CEST)
- INSEE/Postal code: 51557 /51300
- ^{1} French Land Register data, which excludes lakes, ponds, glaciers > 1 km^{2} (0.386 sq mi or 247 acres) and river estuaries.

Soulanges (French pronunciation: [sulɑ̃ʒ]) is a commune in the Marne department in north-eastern France.

== See also ==
- Communes of the Marne department
