= Lignon, Marne =

Lignon
- Commune
- Location of Lignon
- Location within France Location within Grand Est
- Coordinates: 48°35′12″N 4°31′55″E
- Country: France
- Region: Grand Est
- Department: Marne
- Arrondissement: Vitry-le-François
- Canton: Vitry-le-François-Champagne et Der
- Intercommunality: Vitry, Champagne et Der

Government
  - Mayor (2020–2026): Jean-Marc Gérard
- Area^{1}: 7.5 km^{2} (2.9 sq mi)
- Elevation: 127 m (417 ft)
- Population (2023): 118
  - Density: 16/km^{2} (41/sq mi)
- Demonym(s): Lignonnais, Lignonnaises
- Time zone: UTC+01:00 (CET)
  - Summer (DST): UTC+02:00 (CEST)
- INSEE/Postal code: 51322 /51290
- ^{1} French Land Register data, which excludes lakes, ponds, glaciers > 1 km^{2} (0.386 sq mi or 247 acres) and river estuaries.

Lignon (French pronunciation: [liɲɔ̃]) is a commune in the Marne department in north-eastern France.

== Population ==
Historical population
Year	Pop.	±% p.a.
1968	89	—
1975	80	−1.51%
1982	83	+0.53%
1990	82	−0.15%
1999	86	+0.53%
2007	89	+0.43%
2012	115	+5.26%
2017	127	+2.00%
2023	118	−1.22%
Source: INSEE

== See also ==
- Communes of the Marne department
