= Couvrot =

- Commune
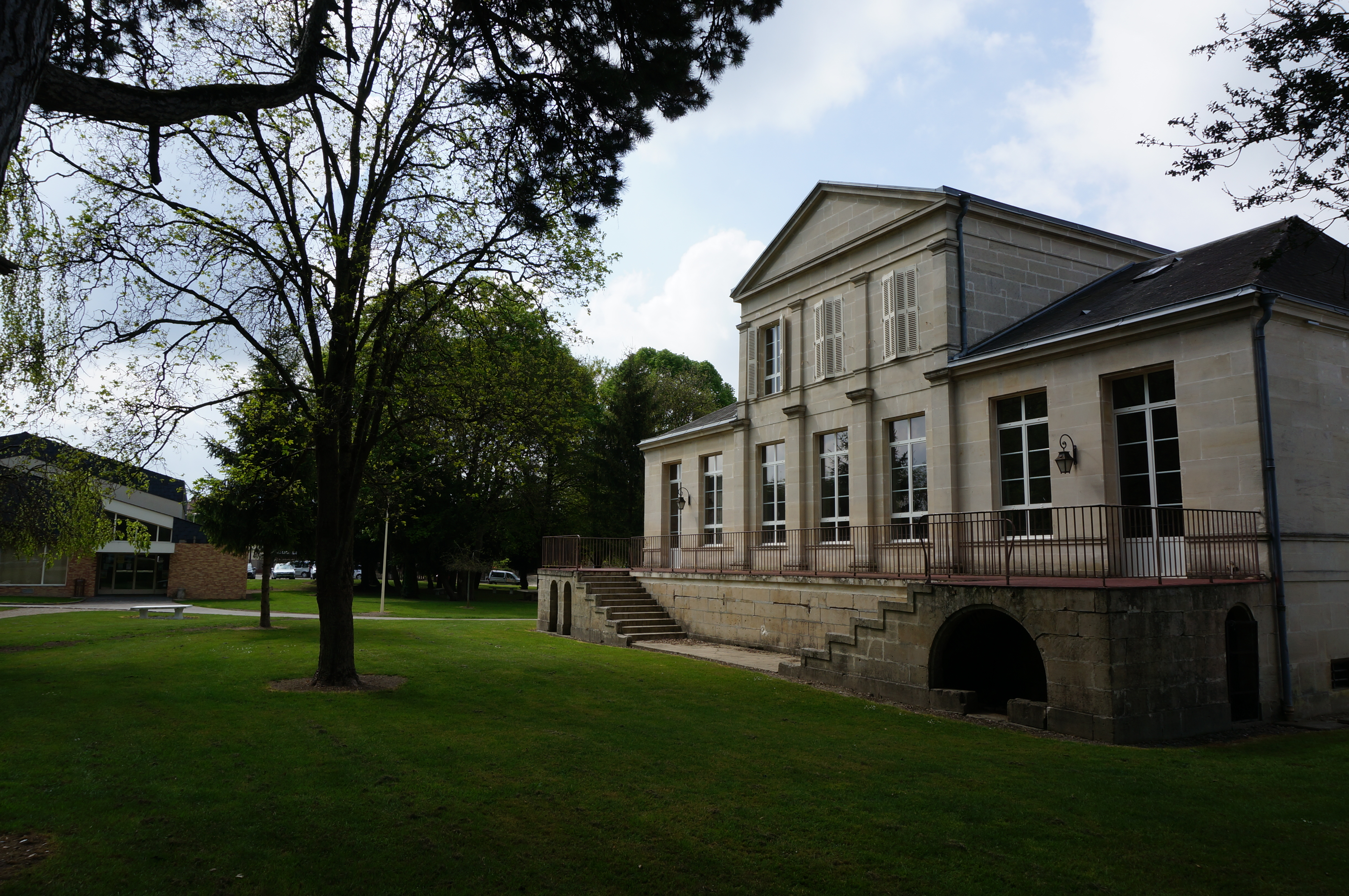
- The town hall in Couvrot
- Location of Couvrot
- Location within France Location within Grand Est
- Coordinates: 48°45′37″N 4°34′21″E
- Country: France
- Region: Grand Est
- Department: Marne
- Arrondissement: Vitry-le-François
- Canton: Vitry-le-François-Champagne et Der

Government
  - Mayor (2020–2026): Olivier Delcombel
- Area^{1}: 8.05 km^{2} (3.11 sq mi)
- Elevation: 125 m (410 ft)
- Population (2023): 786
  - Density: 97.6/km^{2} (253/sq mi)
- Time zone: UTC+01:00 (CET)
  - Summer (DST): UTC+02:00 (CEST)
- INSEE/Postal code: 51195 /51300
- ^{1} French Land Register data, which excludes lakes, ponds, glaciers > 1 km^{2} (0.386 sq mi or 247 acres) and river estuaries.

Couvrot (French pronunciation: [kuvʁo]) is a commune in the Marne department in north-eastern France.

== See also ==
- Communes of the Marne department
