= Arzillières-Neuville =

- Commune
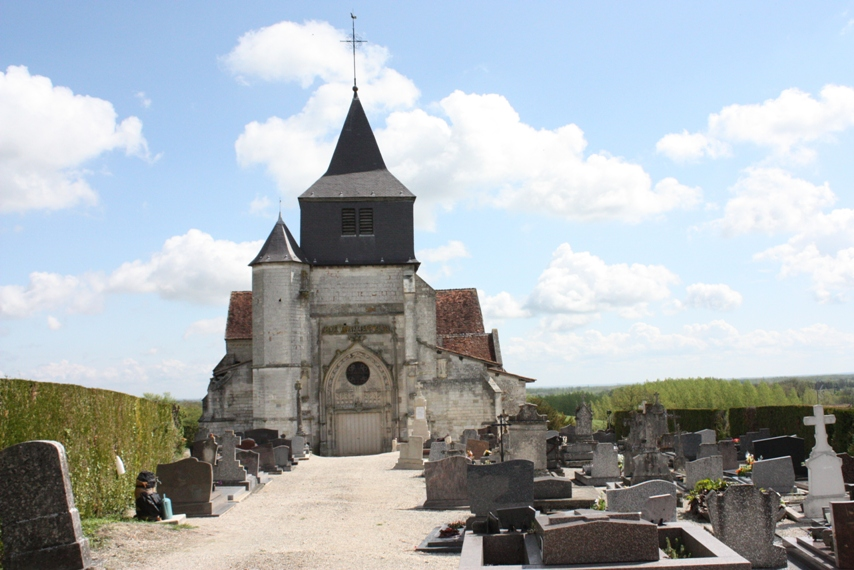
- The church in Arzillières-Neuville

- Coat of arms
- Location of Arzillières-Neuville
- Location within France Location within Grand Est
- Coordinates: 48°38′44″N 4°35′21″E
- Country: France
- Region: Grand Est
- Department: Marne
- Arrondissement: Vitry-le-François
- Canton: Vitry-le-François-Champagne et Der
- Intercommunality: CC Vitry Champagne Der

Government
  - Mayor (2020–2026): Michel Cappé
- Area^{1}: 12.23 km^{2} (4.72 sq mi)
- Elevation: 116 m (381 ft)
- Population (2023): 322
  - Density: 26.3/km^{2} (68.2/sq mi)
- Time zone: UTC+01:00 (CET)
  - Summer (DST): UTC+02:00 (CEST)
- INSEE/Postal code: 51017 /51290
- ^{1} French Land Register data, which excludes lakes, ponds, glaciers > 1 km^{2} (0.386 sq mi or 247 acres) and river estuaries.

Arzillières-Neuville (French pronunciation: [aʁziljɛʁ nøvil]) is a commune in the Marne department in northeastern France.

== Population ==
Historical population
Year	Pop.	±% p.a.
1968	251	—
1975	223	−1.68%
1982	214	−0.59%
1990	275	+3.18%
1999	312	+1.41%
2007	330	+0.70%
2012	354	+1.41%
2017	327	−1.57%
2023	322	−0.26%
Source: INSEE

== See also ==
- Communes of the Marne department
