= Pringy, Marne =

Pringy
- Commune
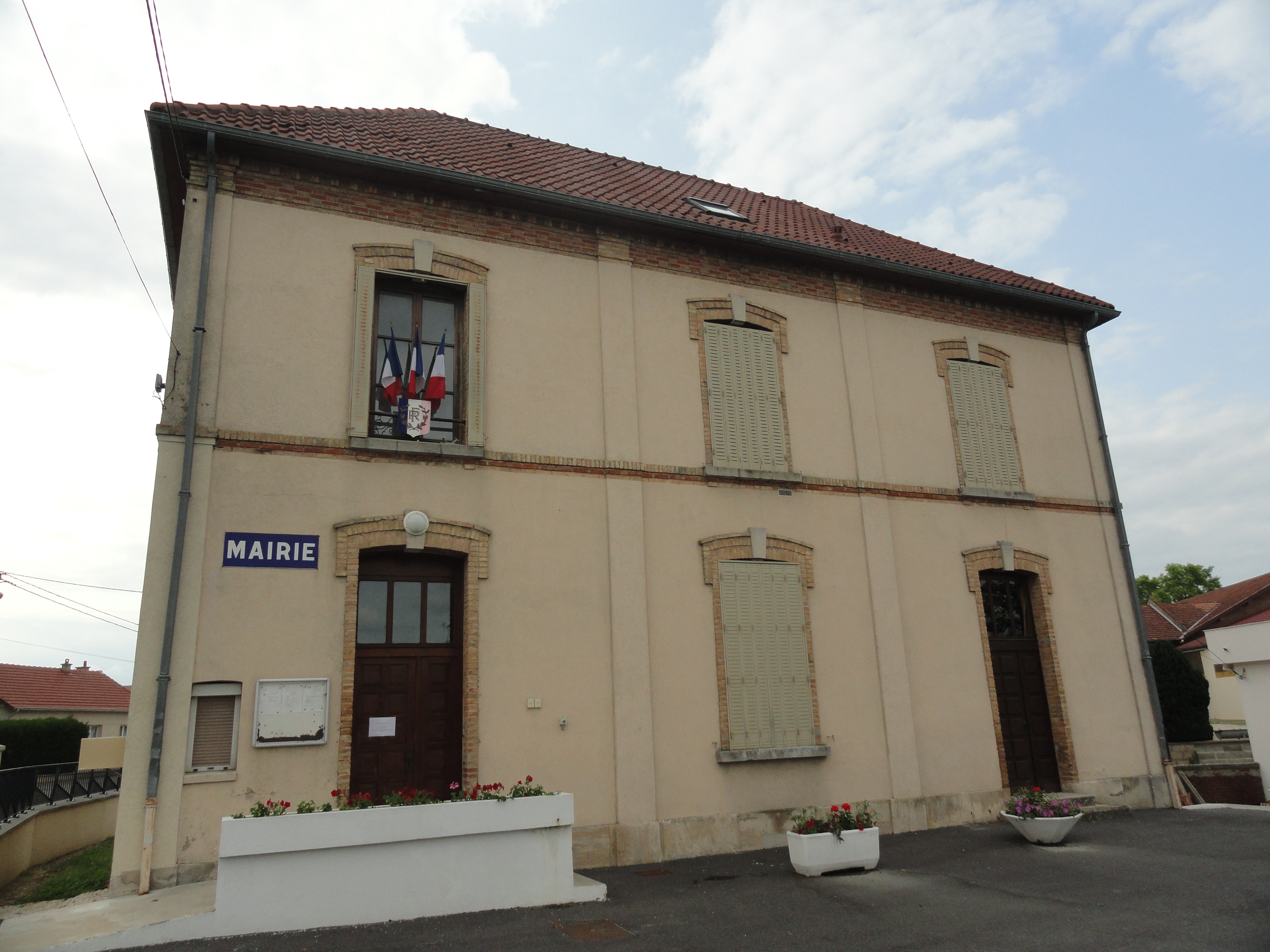
- The town hall in Pringy

- Coat of arms
- Location of Pringy
- Location within France Location within Grand Est
- Coordinates: 48°46′53″N 4°31′03″E
- Country: France
- Region: Grand Est
- Department: Marne
- Arrondissement: Vitry-le-François
- Canton: Vitry-le-François-Champagne et Der

Government
  - Mayor (2020–2026): Daniel Gaumont
- Area^{1}: 15.34 km^{2} (5.92 sq mi)
- Elevation: 98 m (322 ft)
- Population (2023): 438
  - Density: 28.6/km^{2} (74.0/sq mi)
- Time zone: UTC+01:00 (CET)
  - Summer (DST): UTC+02:00 (CEST)
- INSEE/Postal code: 51446 /51300
- ^{1} French Land Register data, which excludes lakes, ponds, glaciers > 1 km^{2} (0.386 sq mi or 247 acres) and river estuaries.

Pringy (French pronunciation: [pʁɛ̃ʒi]) is a commune in the Marne department in north-eastern France.

== See also ==
- Communes of the Marne department
