= Margerie-Hancourt =

- Commune
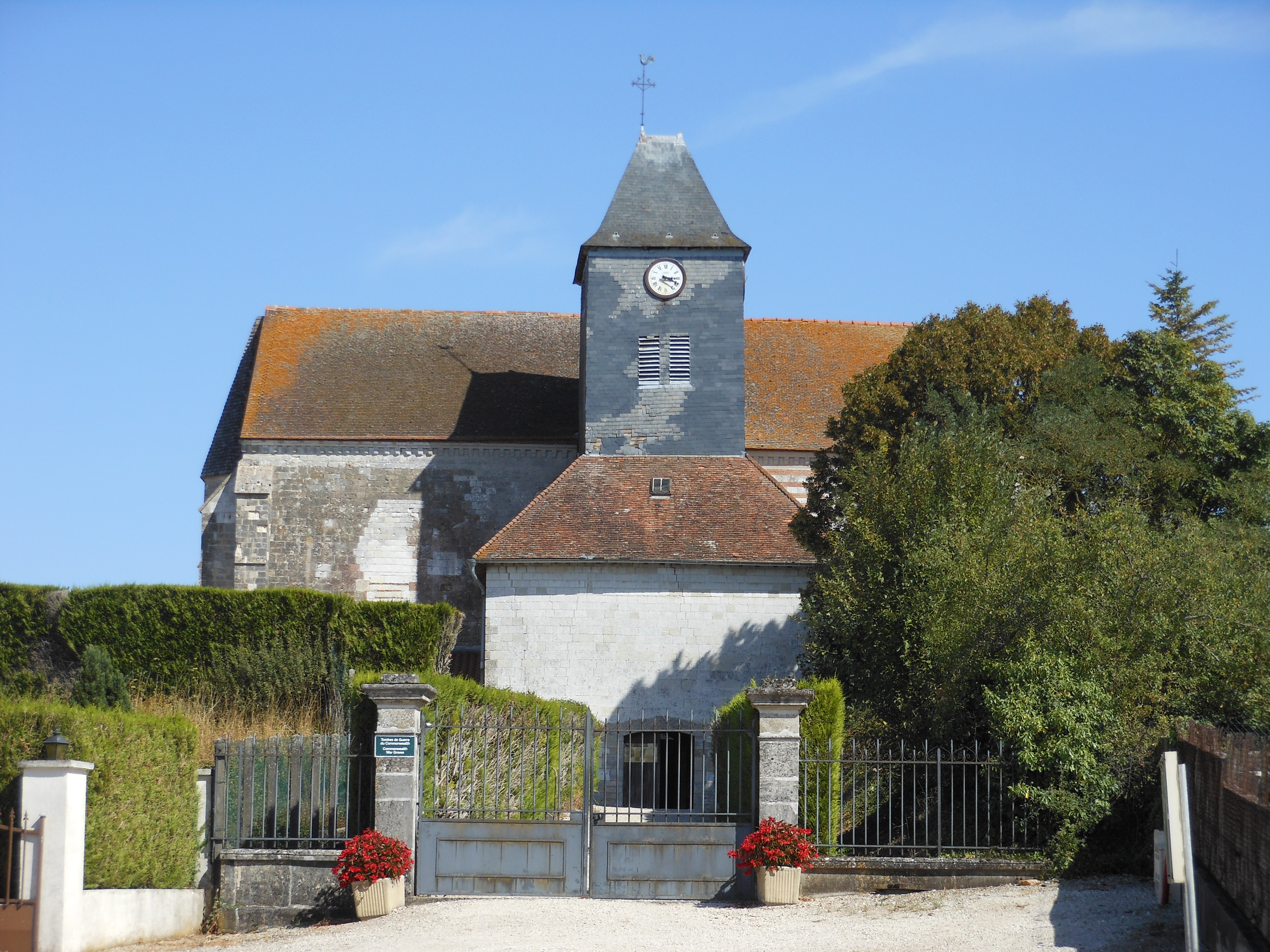
- The church in Margerie

- Coat of arms
- Location of Margerie-Hancourt
- Location within France Location within Grand Est
- Coordinates: 48°33′19″N 4°31′22″E
- Country: France
- Region: Grand Est
- Department: Marne
- Arrondissement: Vitry-le-François
- Canton: Vitry-le-François-Champagne et Der

Government
  - Mayor (2020–2026): Michelle Geoffroy
- Area^{1}: 21.87 km^{2} (8.44 sq mi)
- Elevation: 163 m (535 ft)
- Population (2023): 186
  - Density: 8.50/km^{2} (22.0/sq mi)
- Time zone: UTC+01:00 (CET)
  - Summer (DST): UTC+02:00 (CEST)
- INSEE/Postal code: 51349 /51290
- ^{1} French Land Register data, which excludes lakes, ponds, glaciers > 1 km^{2} (0.386 sq mi or 247 acres) and river estuaries.

Margerie-Hancourt (French pronunciation: [maʁʒəʁi ɑ̃kuʁ]) is a commune in the Marne department in north-eastern France.

== See also ==
- Communes of the Marne department
