= Le Meix-Tiercelin =

- Commune
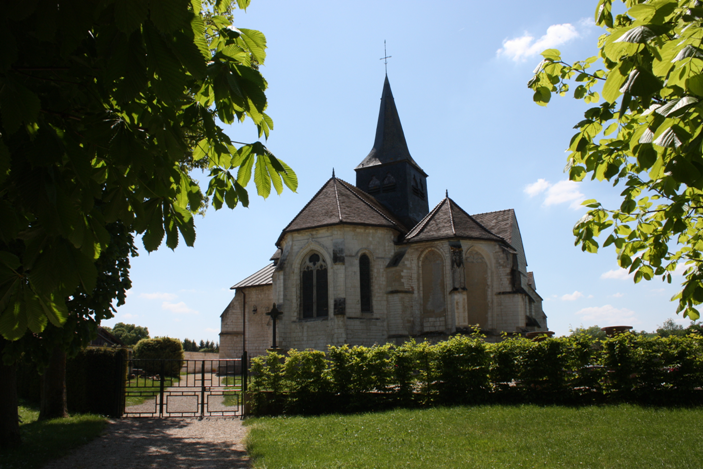
- The church in Le Meix-Tiercelin

- Coat of arms
- Location of Le Meix-Tiercelin
- Location within France Location within Grand Est
- Coordinates: 48°38′21″N 4°25′06″E
- Country: France
- Region: Grand Est
- Department: Marne
- Arrondissement: Vitry-le-François
- Canton: Vitry-le-François-Champagne et Der
- Intercommunality: CC Vitry, Champagne et Der

Government
  - Mayor (2020–2026): René Mautrait
- Area^{1}: 19.41 km^{2} (7.49 sq mi)
- Elevation: 131 m (430 ft)
- Population (2023): 170
  - Density: 8.8/km^{2} (23/sq mi)
- Time zone: UTC+01:00 (CET)
  - Summer (DST): UTC+02:00 (CEST)
- INSEE/Postal code: 51361 /51320
- ^{1} French Land Register data, which excludes lakes, ponds, glaciers > 1 km^{2} (0.386 sq mi or 247 acres) and river estuaries.

Le Meix-Tiercelin is a commune in the Marne department in the Grand Est region in north-eastern France.

== See also ==
- Communes of the Marne department
