= Brusson =

Brusson can refer to:

- Brusson, Aosta Valley, commune in Italy
- Brusson, Marne, commune in France
