= Saint-Lumier-en-Champagne =

- Commune
- Location of Saint-Lumier-en-Champagne
- Location within France Location within Grand Est
- Coordinates: 48°47′45″N 4°37′41″E
- Country: France
- Region: Grand Est
- Department: Marne
- Arrondissement: Vitry-le-François
- Canton: Sermaize-les-Bains

Government
  - Mayor (2021–2026): Benoît Prieur
- Area^{1}: 8.56 km^{2} (3.31 sq mi)
- Elevation: 117 m (384 ft)
- Population (2023): 267
  - Density: 31.2/km^{2} (80.8/sq mi)
- Time zone: UTC+01:00 (CET)
  - Summer (DST): UTC+02:00 (CEST)
- INSEE/Postal code: 51496 /51300
- ^{1} French Land Register data, which excludes lakes, ponds, glaciers > 1 km^{2} (0.386 sq mi or 247 acres) and river estuaries.

Saint-Lumier-en-Champagne (French pronunciation: [sɛ̃ lymje ɑ̃ ʃɑ̃paɲ], literally Saint-Lumier in Champagne) is a commune in the Marne department in north-eastern France.

== See also ==
- Communes of the Marne department
