= Écriennes =

- Commune
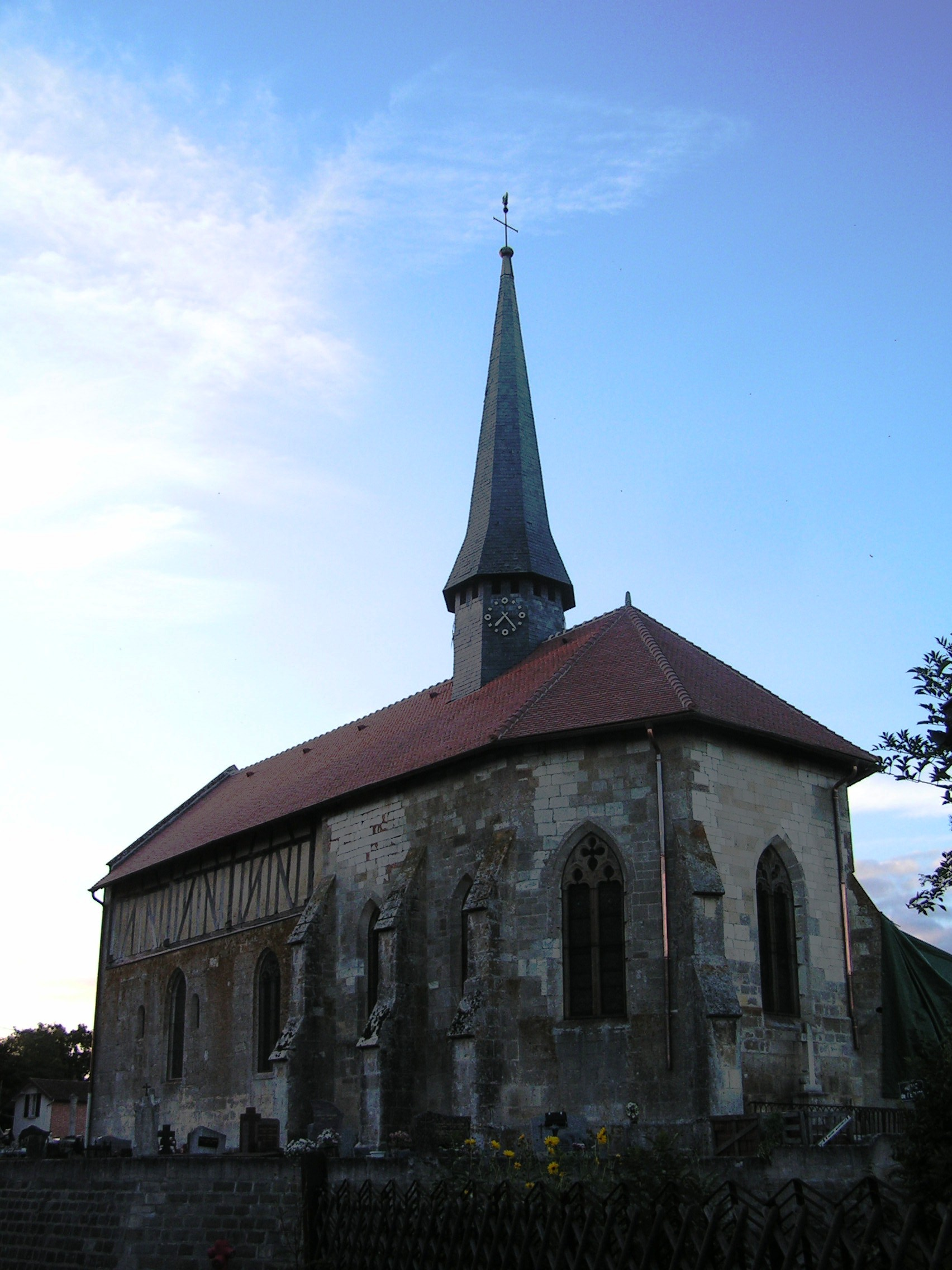
- The church in Écriennes

- Coat of arms
- Location of Écriennes
- Location within France Location within Grand Est
- Coordinates: 48°41′33″N 4°41′05″E
- Country: France
- Region: Grand Est
- Department: Marne
- Arrondissement: Vitry-le-François
- Canton: Sermaize-les-Bains
- Intercommunality: Perthois-Bocage et Der

Government
  - Mayor (2020–2026): Jean-Marc Bonnefoi
- Area^{1}: 6.36 km^{2} (2.46 sq mi)
- Elevation: 124 m (407 ft)
- Population (2023): 165
  - Density: 25.9/km^{2} (67.2/sq mi)
- Time zone: UTC+01:00 (CET)
  - Summer (DST): UTC+02:00 (CEST)
- INSEE/Postal code: 51224 /51300
- ^{1} French Land Register data, which excludes lakes, ponds, glaciers > 1 km^{2} (0.386 sq mi or 247 acres) and river estuaries.

Écriennes (French pronunciation: [ekʁijɛn]) is a commune in the Marne department in north-eastern France.

== See also ==
- Communes of the Marne department
