= Norrois =

- Commune
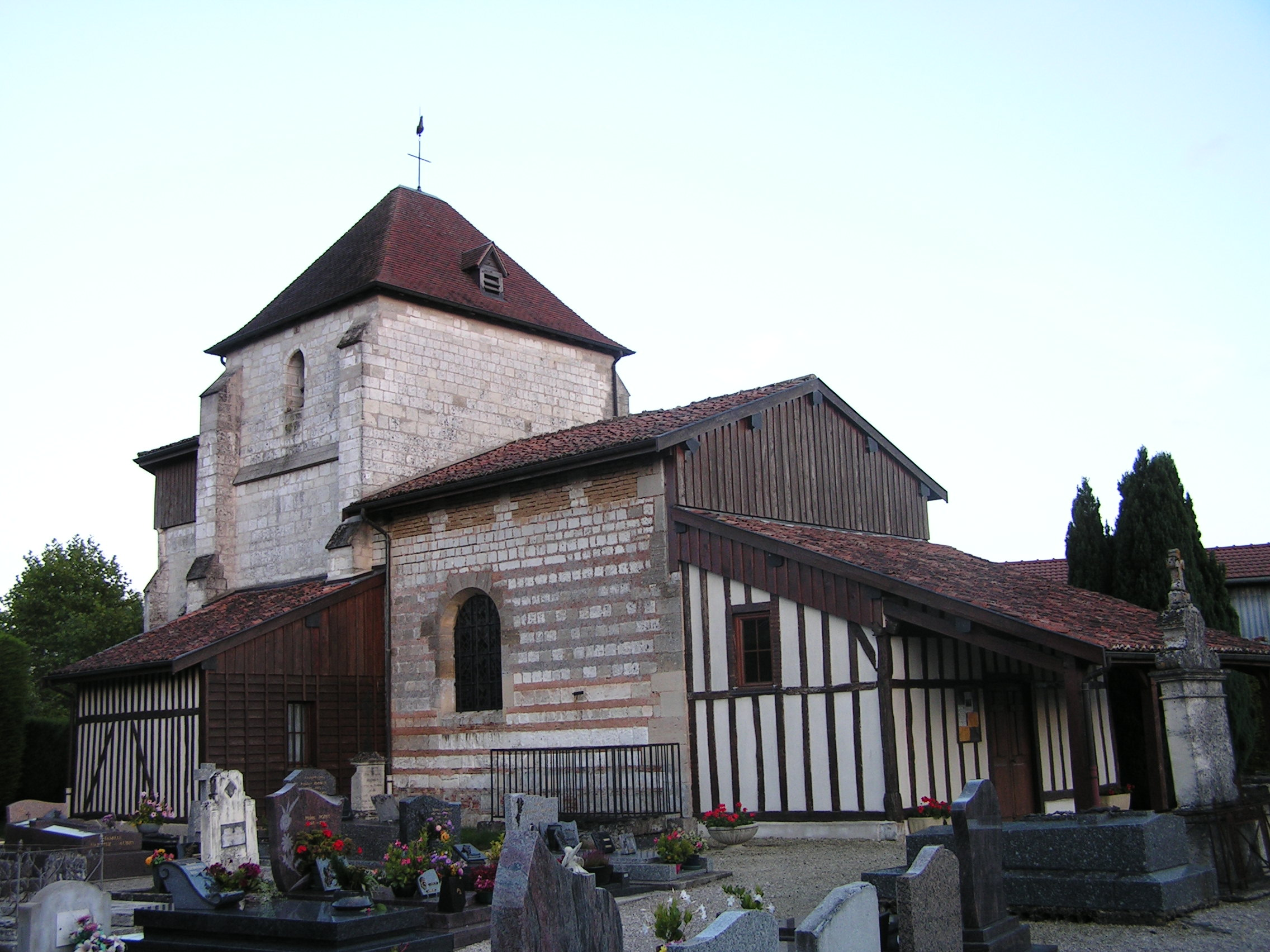
- The church in Norrois

- Coat of arms
- Location of Norrois
- Location within France Location within Grand Est
- Coordinates: 48°40′15″N 4°37′34″E
- Country: France
- Region: Grand Est
- Department: Marne
- Arrondissement: Vitry-le-François
- Canton: Sermaize-les-Bains
- Intercommunality: Perthois-Bocage et Der

Government
  - Mayor (2020–2026): Rémy Fougerouse
- Area^{1}: 4.14 km^{2} (1.60 sq mi)
- Elevation: 109 m (358 ft)
- Population (2023): 151
  - Density: 36.5/km^{2} (94.5/sq mi)
- Time zone: UTC+01:00 (CET)
  - Summer (DST): UTC+02:00 (CEST)
- INSEE/Postal code: 51406 /51300
- ^{1} French Land Register data, which excludes lakes, ponds, glaciers > 1 km^{2} (0.386 sq mi or 247 acres) and river estuaries.

Norrois (French pronunciation: [nɔʁwa]) is a commune in the Marne department in north-eastern France.

== See also ==
- Communes of the Marne department
