= Bassuet =

- Commune
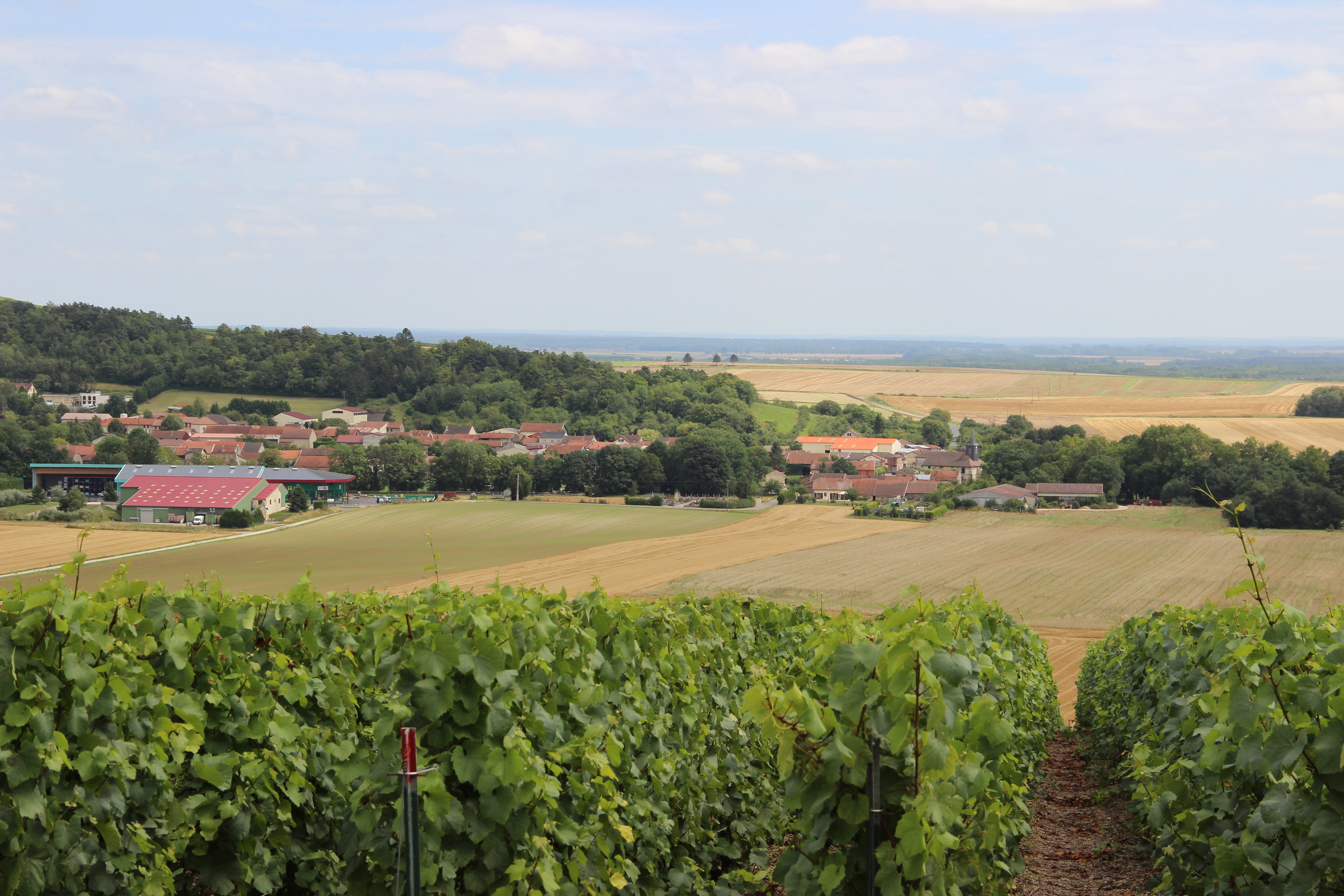
- A general view of Bassuet
- Location of Bassuet
- Location within France Location within Grand Est
- Coordinates: 48°47′54″N 4°40′06″E
- Country: France
- Region: Grand Est
- Department: Marne
- Arrondissement: Vitry-le-François
- Canton: Sermaize-les-Bains

Government
  - Mayor (2020–2026): Carole Ganster
- Area^{1}: 8.42 km^{2} (3.25 sq mi)
- Highest elevation: 193 m (633 ft)
- Lowest elevation: 127 m (417 ft)
- Population (2023): 235
  - Density: 27.9/km^{2} (72.3/sq mi)
- Time zone: UTC+01:00 (CET)
  - Summer (DST): UTC+02:00 (CEST)
- INSEE/Postal code: 51040 /51300
- ^{1} French Land Register data, which excludes lakes, ponds, glaciers > 1 km^{2} (0.386 sq mi or 247 acres) and river estuaries.

Bassuet (French pronunciation: [basɥɛ]) is a commune in the Marne department in northeastern France.

== Population ==
Historical population
Year	Pop.	±% p.a.
1968	292	—
1975	285	−0.35%
1982	384	+4.35%
1990	391	+0.23%
1999	347	−1.32%
2007	273	−2.95%
2012	261	−0.89%
2017	257	−0.31%
2023	235	−1.48%
Source: INSEE

== See also ==
- Communes of the Marne department
