= Larzicourt =

- Commune
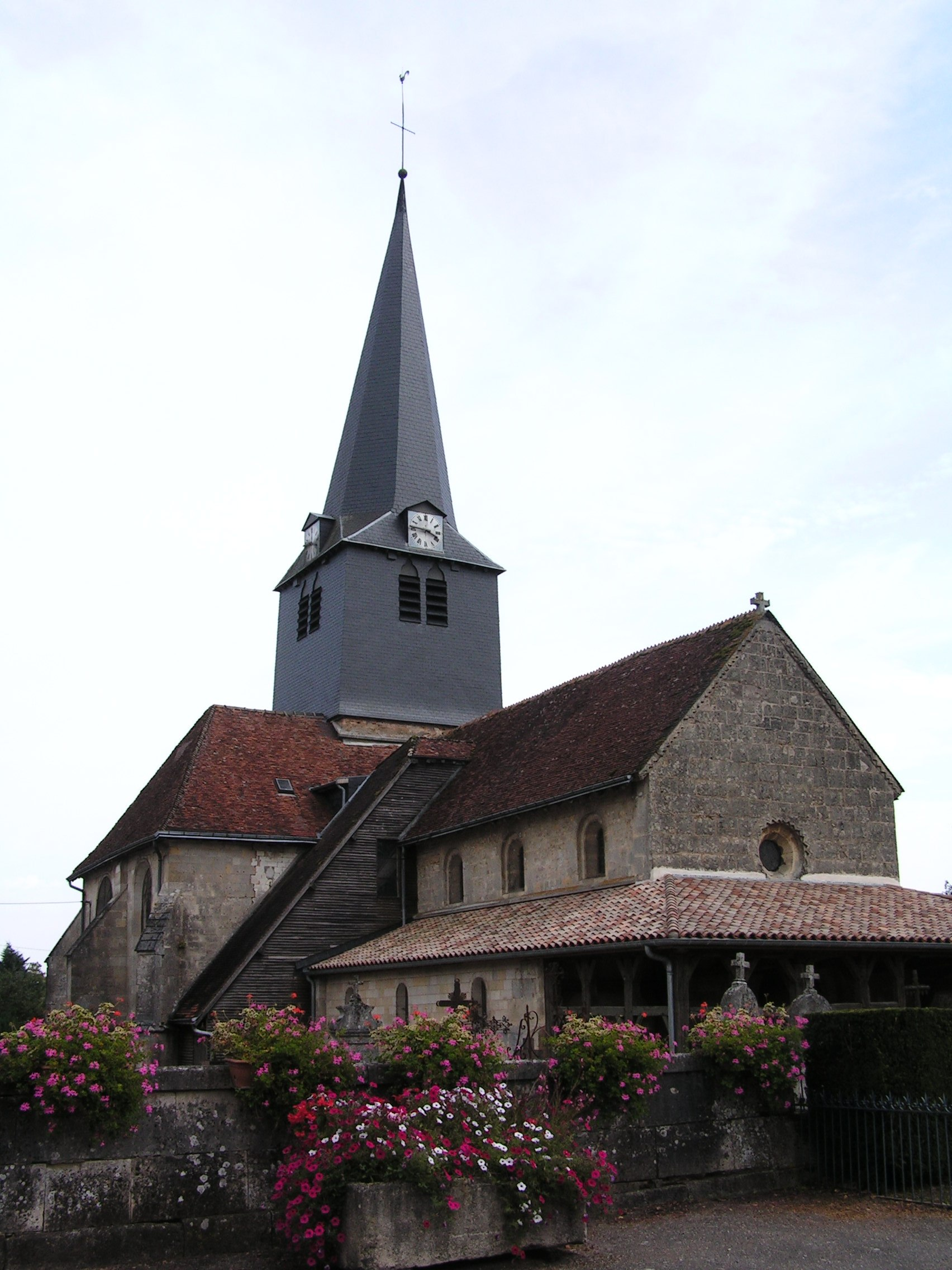
- The church in Larzicourt

- Coat of arms
- Location of Larzicourt
- Location within France Location within Grand Est
- Coordinates: 48°38′12″N 4°42′46″E
- Country: France
- Region: Grand Est
- Department: Marne
- Arrondissement: Vitry-le-François
- Canton: Sermaize-les-Bains
- Intercommunality: Perthois-Bocage et Der

Government
  - Mayor (2020–2026): Régis Bourgoin
- Area^{1}: 16.86 km^{2} (6.51 sq mi)
- Elevation: 116 m (381 ft)
- Population (2023): 269
  - Density: 16.0/km^{2} (41.3/sq mi)
- Time zone: UTC+01:00 (CET)
  - Summer (DST): UTC+02:00 (CEST)
- INSEE/Postal code: 51316 /51290
- ^{1} French Land Register data, which excludes lakes, ponds, glaciers > 1 km^{2} (0.386 sq mi or 247 acres) and river estuaries.

Larzicourt (French pronunciation: [laʁzikuʁ]) is a commune in the Marne department in north-eastern France.

== See also ==
- Communes of the Marne department
