= Plichancourt =

- Commune
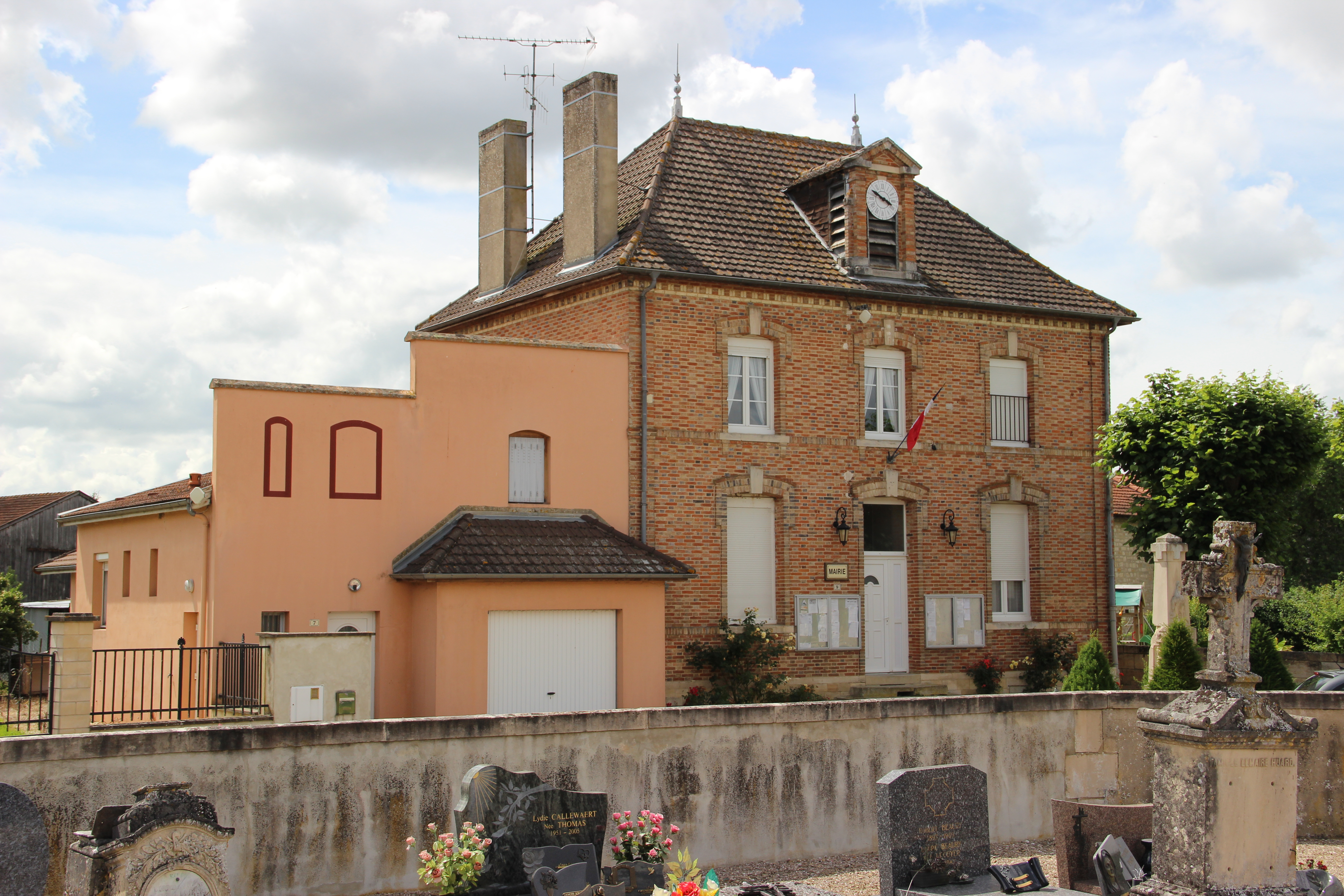
- The town hall in Plichancourt
- Location of Plichancourt
- Location within France Location within Grand Est
- Coordinates: 48°44′48″N 4°40′33″E
- Country: France
- Region: Grand Est
- Department: Marne
- Arrondissement: Vitry-le-François
- Canton: Sermaize-les-Bains
- Intercommunality: Côtes de Champagne et Val de Saulx

Government
  - Mayor (2020–2026): Christian Seys
- Area^{1}: 5.89 km^{2} (2.27 sq mi)
- Elevation: 104 m (341 ft)
- Population (2023): 248
  - Density: 42.1/km^{2} (109/sq mi)
- Time zone: UTC+01:00 (CET)
  - Summer (DST): UTC+02:00 (CEST)
- INSEE/Postal code: 51433 /51300
- ^{1} French Land Register data, which excludes lakes, ponds, glaciers > 1 km^{2} (0.386 sq mi or 247 acres) and river estuaries.

Plichancourt (French pronunciation: [pliʃɑ̃kuʁ]) is a commune in the Marne department in north-eastern France.

== See also ==
- Communes of the Marne department
