= Vavray-le-Petit =

- Commune
- Location of Vavray-le-Petit
- Location within France Location within Grand Est
- Coordinates: 48°48′23″N 4°42′52″E
- Country: France
- Region: Grand Est
- Department: Marne
- Arrondissement: Vitry-le-François
- Canton: Sermaize-les-Bains
- Intercommunality: Côtes de Champagne et Val de Saulx

Government
  - Mayor (2020–2026): Stéphane Train
- Area^{1}: 5.39 km^{2} (2.08 sq mi)
- Elevation: 125 m (410 ft)
- Population (2023): 60
  - Density: 11/km^{2} (29/sq mi)
- Time zone: UTC+01:00 (CET)
  - Summer (DST): UTC+02:00 (CEST)
- INSEE/Postal code: 51602 /51300
- ^{1} French Land Register data, which excludes lakes, ponds, glaciers > 1 km^{2} (0.386 sq mi or 247 acres) and river estuaries.

Vavray-le-Petit (French pronunciation: [vavʁɛ lə pəti]) is a commune in the Marne department in north-eastern France.

== See also ==
- Communes of the Marne department
