= Luxémont-et-Villotte =

- Commune
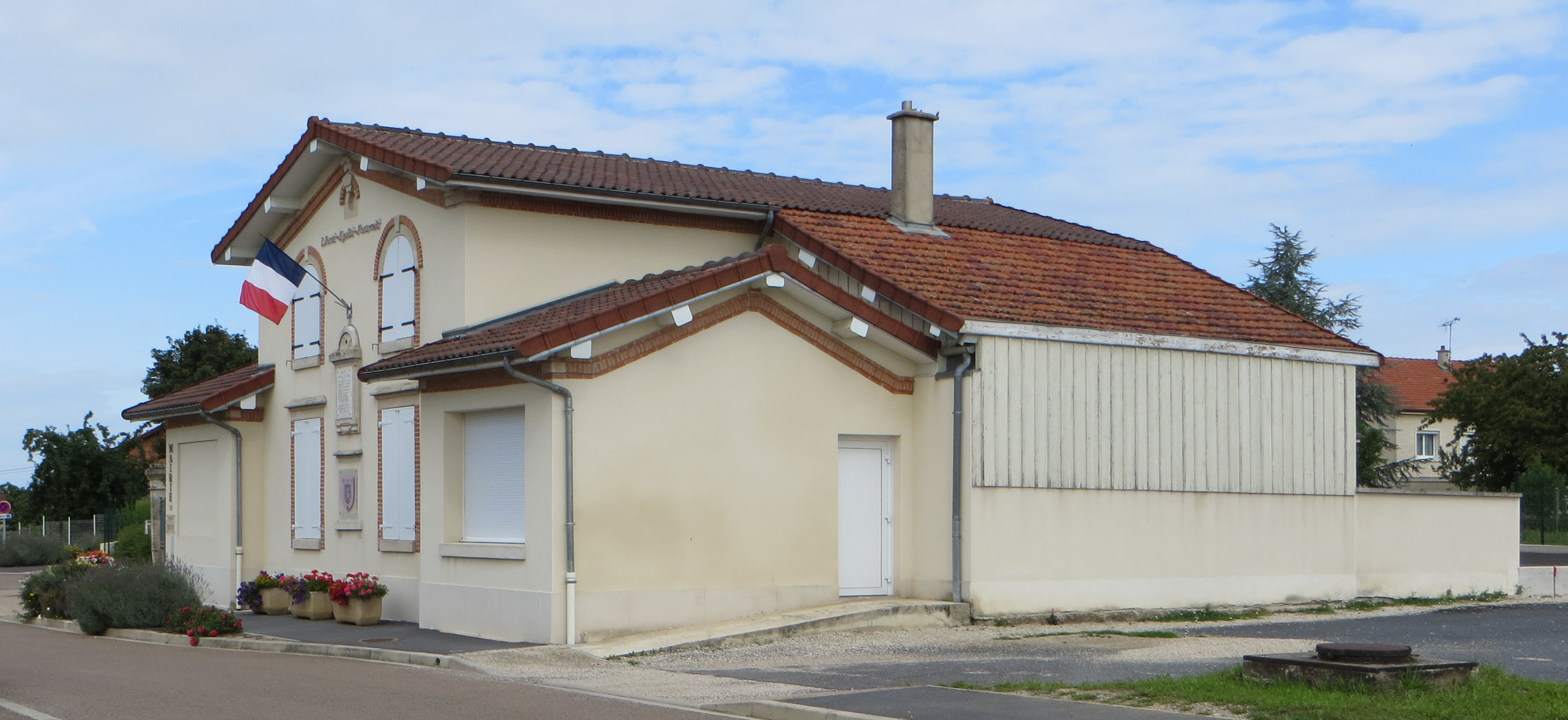
- Town hall

- Coat of arms
- Location of Luxémont-et-Villotte
- Location within France Location within Grand Est
- Coordinates: 48°41′48″N 4°38′04″E
- Country: France
- Region: Grand Est
- Department: Marne
- Arrondissement: Vitry-le-François
- Canton: Sermaize-les-Bains
- Intercommunality: Perthois-Bocage et Der

Government
  - Mayor (2020–2026): Gilles Gagneux
- Area^{1}: 9.19 km^{2} (3.55 sq mi)
- Elevation: 110 m (360 ft)
- Population (2023): 448
  - Density: 48.7/km^{2} (126/sq mi)
- Time zone: UTC+01:00 (CET)
  - Summer (DST): UTC+02:00 (CEST)
- INSEE/Postal code: 51334 /51300
- ^{1} French Land Register data, which excludes lakes, ponds, glaciers > 1 km^{2} (0.386 sq mi or 247 acres) and river estuaries.

Luxémont-et-Villotte (French pronunciation: [lyksemɔ̃ e vilɔt]) is a commune in the Marne department in north-eastern France.

== See also ==
- Communes of the Marne department
