= Val-de-Vière =

- Commune
- Coat of arms
- Location of Val-de-Vière
- Location within France Location within Grand Est
- Coordinates: 48°48′48″N 4°44′03″E
- Country: France
- Region: Grand Est
- Department: Marne
- Arrondissement: Vitry-le-François
- Canton: Sermaize-les-Bains
- Intercommunality: Côtes de Champagne et Val de Saulx

Government
  - Mayor (2025–2026): Lucien Collin
- Area^{1}: 19.25 km^{2} (7.43 sq mi)
- Population (2023): 131
  - Density: 6.81/km^{2} (17.6/sq mi)
- Time zone: UTC+01:00 (CET)
  - Summer (DST): UTC+02:00 (CEST)
- INSEE/Postal code: 51218 /51340
- ^{1} French Land Register data, which excludes lakes, ponds, glaciers > 1 km^{2} (0.386 sq mi or 247 acres) and river estuaries.

Val-de-Vière (French pronunciation: [val də vjɛʁ]) is a commune in the Marne department in the Grand Est region in north-eastern France.

== See also ==
- Communes of the Marne department
