= Moncetz-l'Abbaye =

- Commune
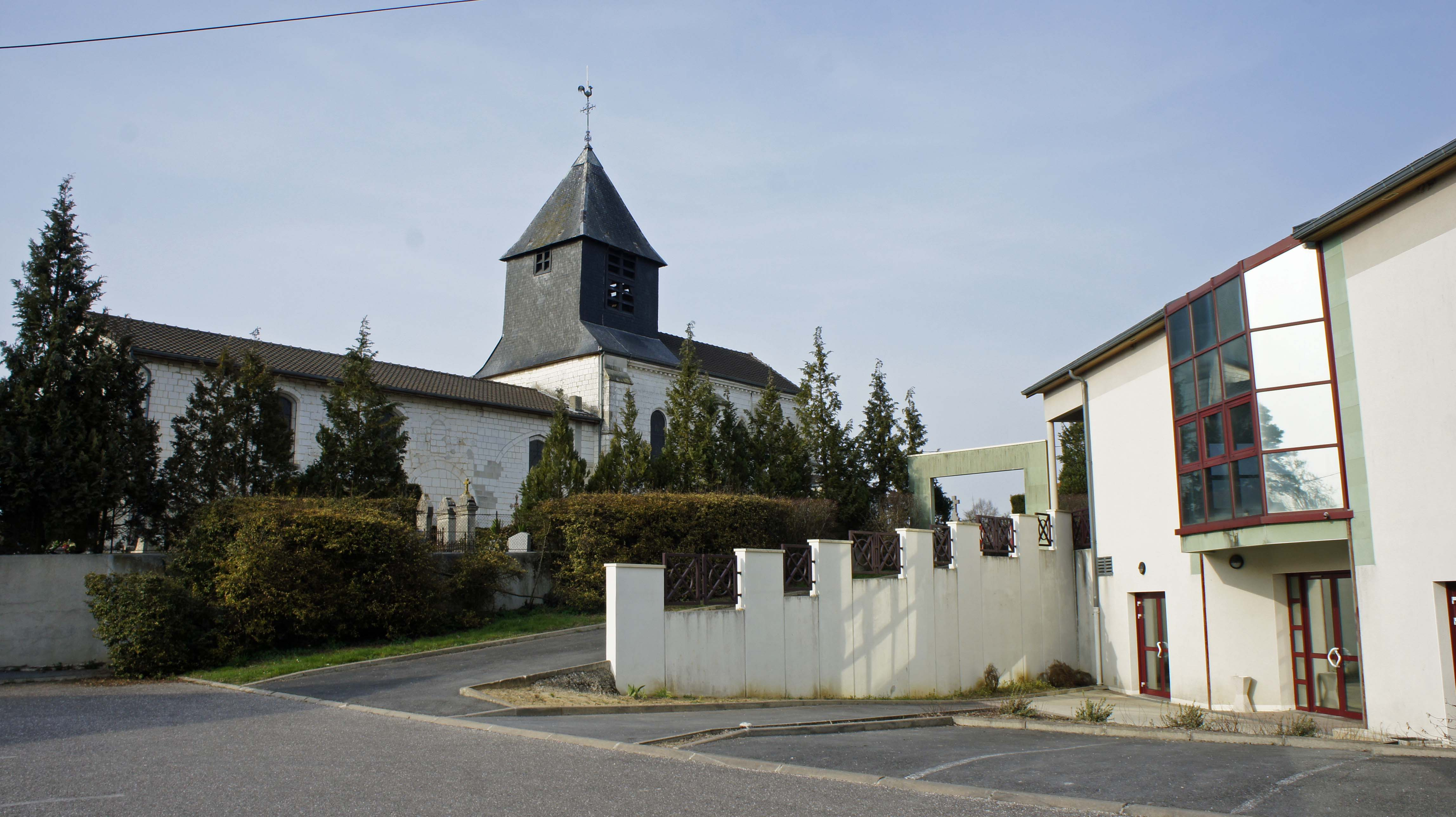
- The church in Moncetz
- Location of Moncetz-l'Abbaye
- Location within France Location within Grand Est
- Coordinates: 48°39′00″N 4°39′21″E
- Country: France
- Region: Grand Est
- Department: Marne
- Arrondissement: Vitry-le-François
- Canton: Sermaize-les-Bains
- Intercommunality: Perthois-Bocage et Der

Government
  - Mayor (2020–2026): Monique Caron
- Area^{1}: 6.95 km^{2} (2.68 sq mi)
- Elevation: 108 m (354 ft)
- Population (2023): 88
  - Density: 13/km^{2} (33/sq mi)
- Time zone: UTC+01:00 (CET)
  - Summer (DST): UTC+02:00 (CEST)
- INSEE/Postal code: 51373 /51290
- ^{1} French Land Register data, which excludes lakes, ponds, glaciers > 1 km^{2} (0.386 sq mi or 247 acres) and river estuaries.

Moncetz-l'Abbaye is a commune in the Marne department in north-eastern France.

== See also ==
- Communes of the Marne department
