= Bassu =

- Commune
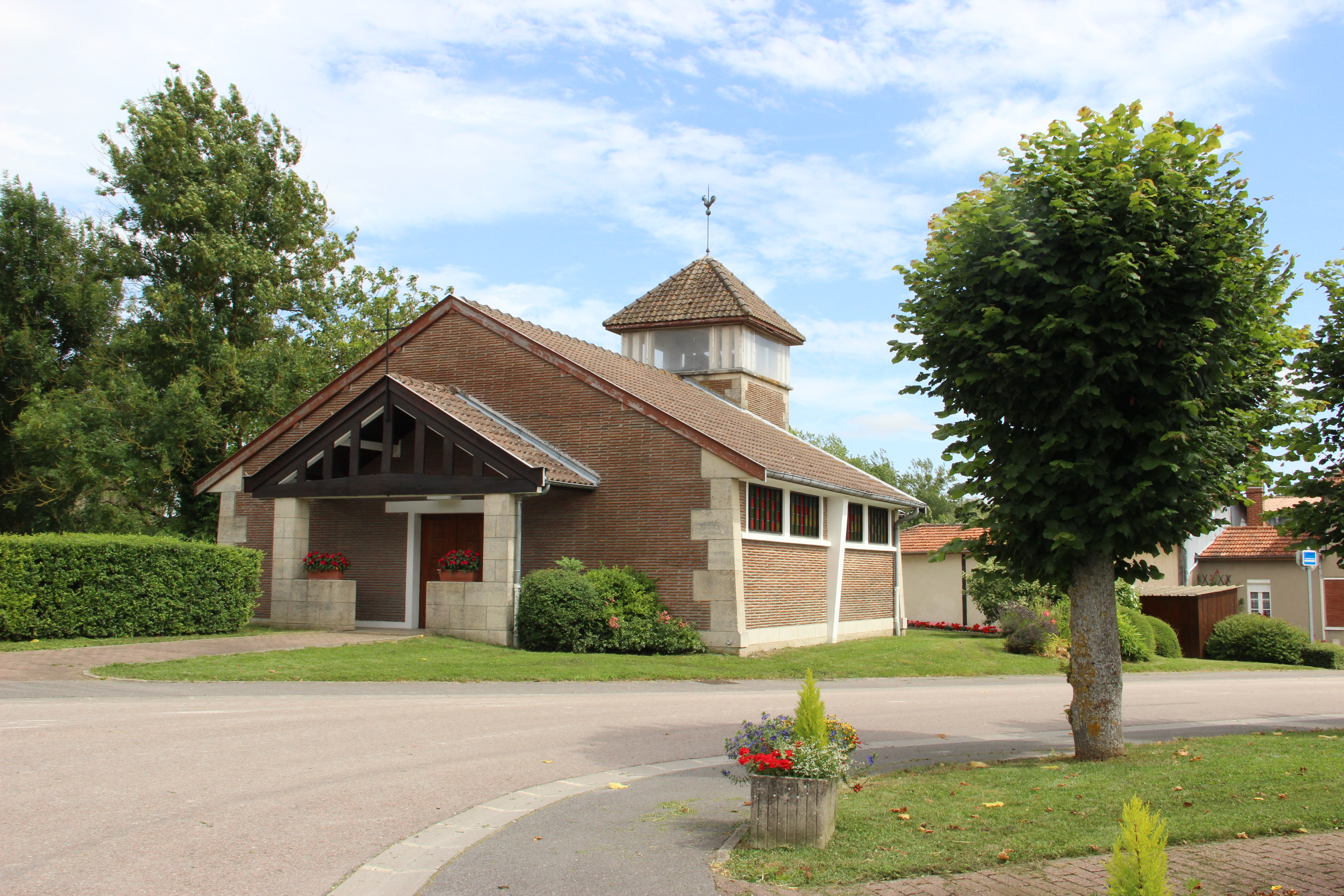
- The church in Bassu
- Location of Bassu
- Location within France Location within Grand Est
- Coordinates: 48°50′00″N 4°41′37″E
- Country: France
- Region: Grand Est
- Department: Marne
- Arrondissement: Vitry-le-François
- Canton: Sermaize-les-Bains

Government
  - Mayor (2023–2026): Didier Sebille
- Area^{1}: 10.29 km^{2} (3.97 sq mi)
- Highest elevation: 193 m (633 ft)
- Lowest elevation: 127 m (417 ft)
- Population (2023): 95
  - Density: 9.2/km^{2} (24/sq mi)
- Time zone: UTC+01:00 (CET)
  - Summer (DST): UTC+02:00 (CEST)
- INSEE/Postal code: 51039 /51300
- ^{1} French Land Register data, which excludes lakes, ponds, glaciers > 1 km^{2} (0.386 sq mi or 247 acres) and river estuaries.

Bassu (French pronunciation: [basy]) is a commune in the Marne department in northeastern France.

== Population ==
Historical population
Year	Pop.	±% p.a.
1968	119	—
1975	96	−3.02%
1982	119	+3.12%
1990	120	+0.10%
1999	129	+0.81%
2007	128	−0.10%
2012	127	−0.16%
2017	103	−4.10%
2023	95	−1.34%
Source: INSEE

== See also ==
- Communes of the Marne department
