= Le Buisson, Marne =

Le Buisson
- Commune
- Location of Le Buisson
- Location within France Location within Grand Est
- Coordinates: 48°45′43″N 4°45′05″E
- Country: France
- Region: Grand Est
- Department: Marne
- Arrondissement: Vitry-le-François
- Canton: Sermaize-les-Bains

Government
  - Mayor (2021–2026): François Chobriat
- Area^{1}: 6.77 km^{2} (2.61 sq mi)
- Elevation: 109 m (358 ft)
- Population (2023): 83
  - Density: 12/km^{2} (32/sq mi)
- Time zone: UTC+01:00 (CET)
  - Summer (DST): UTC+02:00 (CEST)
- INSEE/Postal code: 51095 /51300
- ^{1} French Land Register data, which excludes lakes, ponds, glaciers > 1 km^{2} (0.386 sq mi or 247 acres) and river estuaries.

Le Buisson (French pronunciation: [lə bɥisɔ̃]) is a commune in the Marne department in northeastern France.

== Population ==
Historical population
Year	Pop.	±% p.a.
1968	109	—
1975	98	−1.51%
1982	90	−1.21%
1990	91	+0.14%
1999	91	+0.00%
2007	91	+0.00%
2012	78	−3.04%
2017	92	+3.36%
2023	83	−1.70%
Source: INSEE

== See also ==
- Communes of the Marne department
