= Saint-Amand-sur-Fion =

- Commune
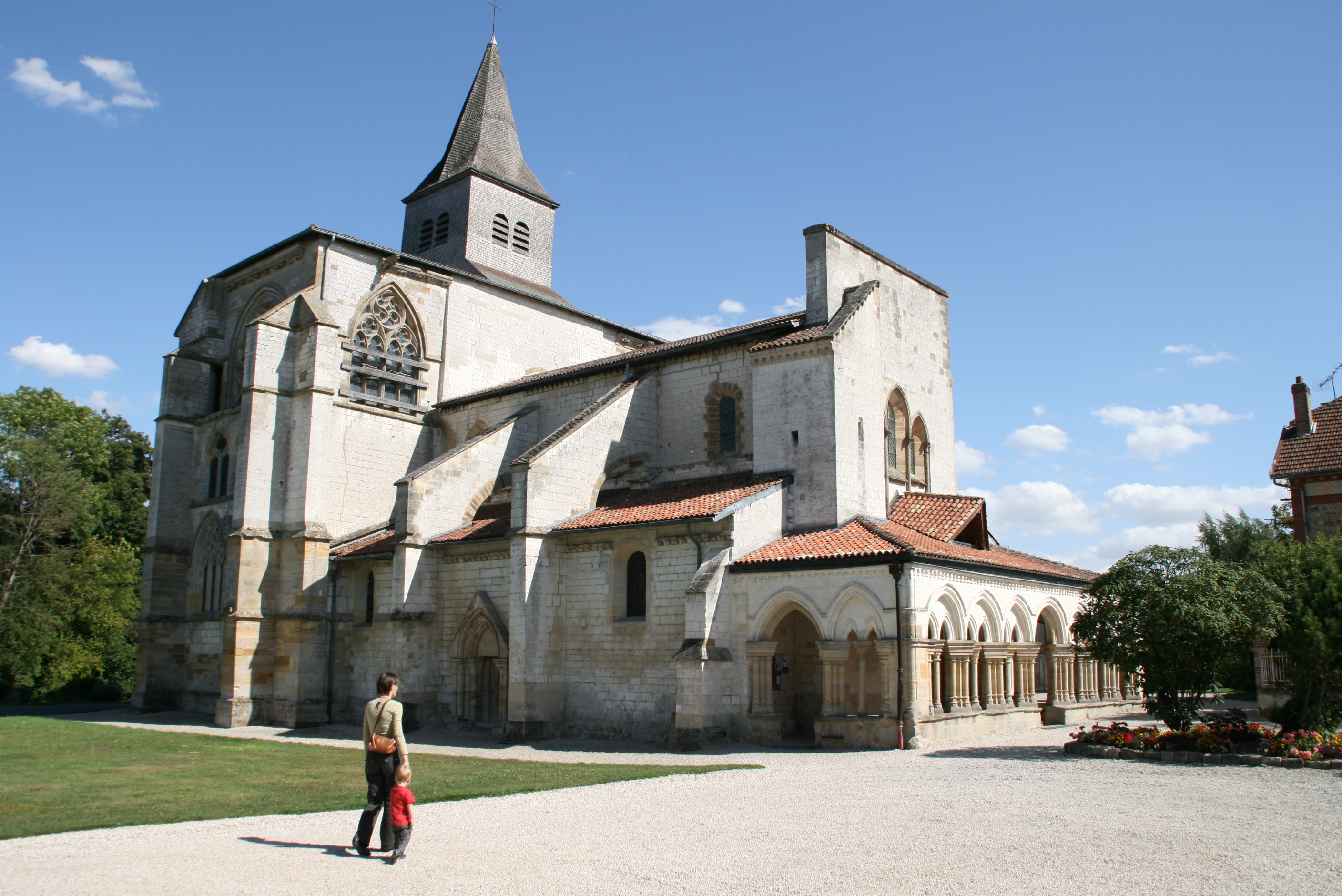
- The church in Saint-Amand-sur-Fion

- Coat of arms
- Location of Saint-Amand-sur-Fion
- Location within France Location within Grand Est
- Coordinates: 48°48′41″N 4°36′35″E
- Country: France
- Region: Grand Est
- Department: Marne
- Arrondissement: Vitry-le-François
- Canton: Sermaize-les-Bains

Government
  - Mayor (2020–2026): Sylvain Lanfroy
- Area^{1}: 28.4 km^{2} (11.0 sq mi)
- Elevation: 90 m (300 ft)
- Population (2023): 1,015
  - Density: 35.7/km^{2} (92.6/sq mi)
- Time zone: UTC+01:00 (CET)
  - Summer (DST): UTC+02:00 (CEST)
- INSEE/Postal code: 51472 /51300
- ^{1} French Land Register data, which excludes lakes, ponds, glaciers > 1 km^{2} (0.386 sq mi or 247 acres) and river estuaries.

Saint-Amand-sur-Fion (French pronunciation: [sɛ̃.t‿amɑ̃ syʁ fjɔ̃]) is a commune in the Marne department in north-eastern France.

== See also ==
- Communes of the Marne department
