= Outines =

- Commune
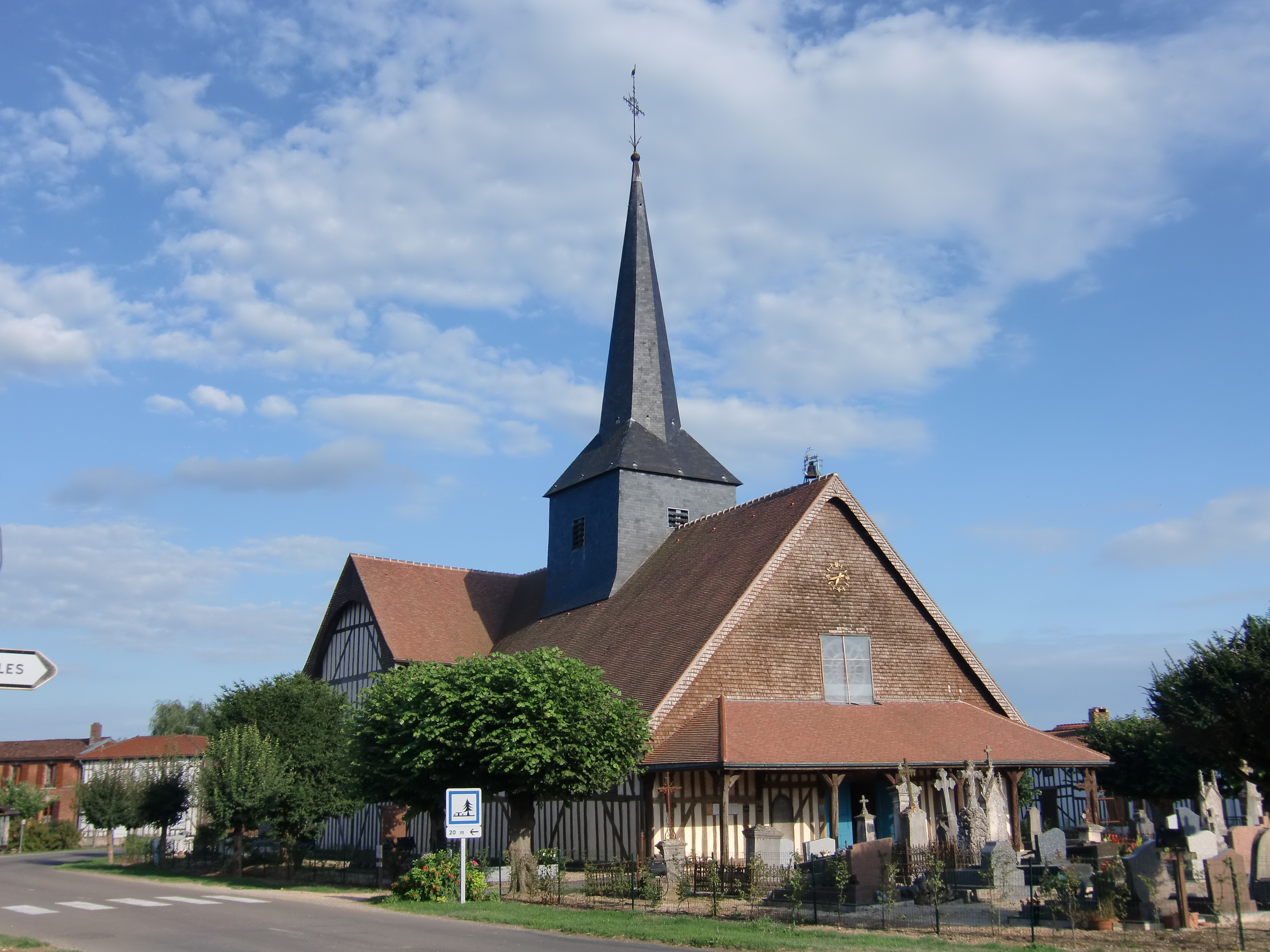
- The church in Outines
- Location of Outines
- Location within France Location within Grand Est
- Coordinates: 48°33′18″N 4°39′04″E
- Country: France
- Region: Grand Est
- Department: Marne
- Arrondissement: Vitry-le-François
- Canton: Sermaize-les-Bains
- Intercommunality: Perthois-Bocage et Der

Government
  - Mayor (2020–2026): Benoît Gerard
- Area^{1}: 15.42 km^{2} (5.95 sq mi)
- Elevation: 137 m (449 ft)
- Population (2023): 130
  - Density: 8.4/km^{2} (22/sq mi)
- Time zone: UTC+01:00 (CET)
  - Summer (DST): UTC+02:00 (CEST)
- INSEE/Postal code: 51419 /51290
- ^{1} French Land Register data, which excludes lakes, ponds, glaciers > 1 km^{2} (0.386 sq mi or 247 acres) and river estuaries.

Outines (French pronunciation: [utin]) is a commune in the Marne department in north-eastern France.

== See also ==
- Communes of the Marne department
