= Scrupt =

- Commune
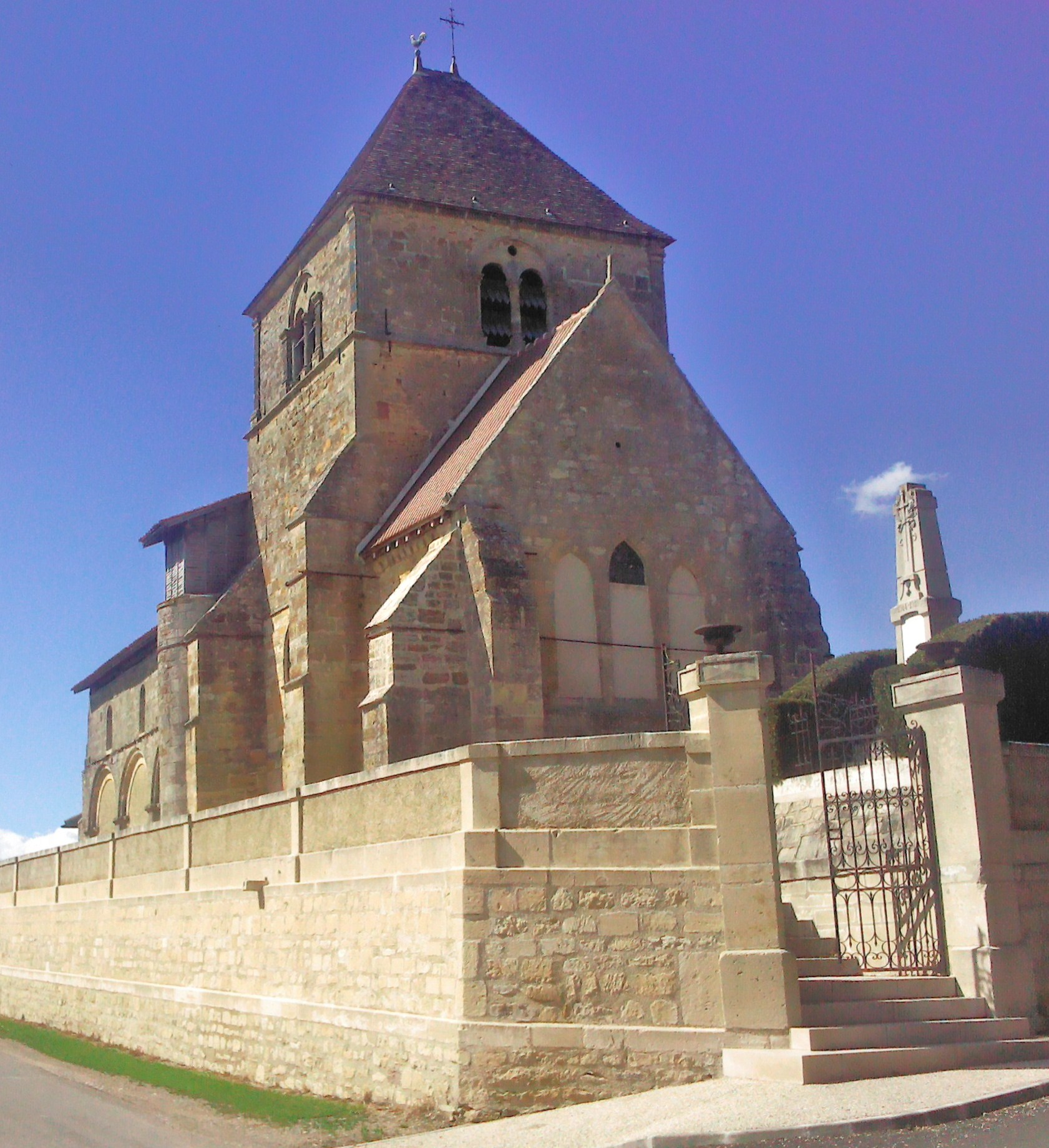
- The church in Scrupt
- Location of Scrupt
- Location within France Location within Grand Est
- Coordinates: 48°43′08″N 4°47′07″E
- Country: France
- Region: Grand Est
- Department: Marne
- Arrondissement: Vitry-le-François
- Canton: Sermaize-les-Bains

Government
  - Mayor (2020–2026): Jean-Philippe Beauvois
- Area^{1}: 11.46 km^{2} (4.42 sq mi)
- Elevation: 132 m (433 ft)
- Population (2023): 124
  - Density: 10.8/km^{2} (28.0/sq mi)
- Time zone: UTC+01:00 (CET)
  - Summer (DST): UTC+02:00 (CEST)
- INSEE/Postal code: 51528 /51340
- ^{1} French Land Register data, which excludes lakes, ponds, glaciers > 1 km^{2} (0.386 sq mi or 247 acres) and river estuaries.

Scrupt (French pronunciation: [skʁy]) is a commune in the Marne department in north-eastern France.

== See also ==
- Communes of the Marne department
