= Gigny-Bussy =

- Commune
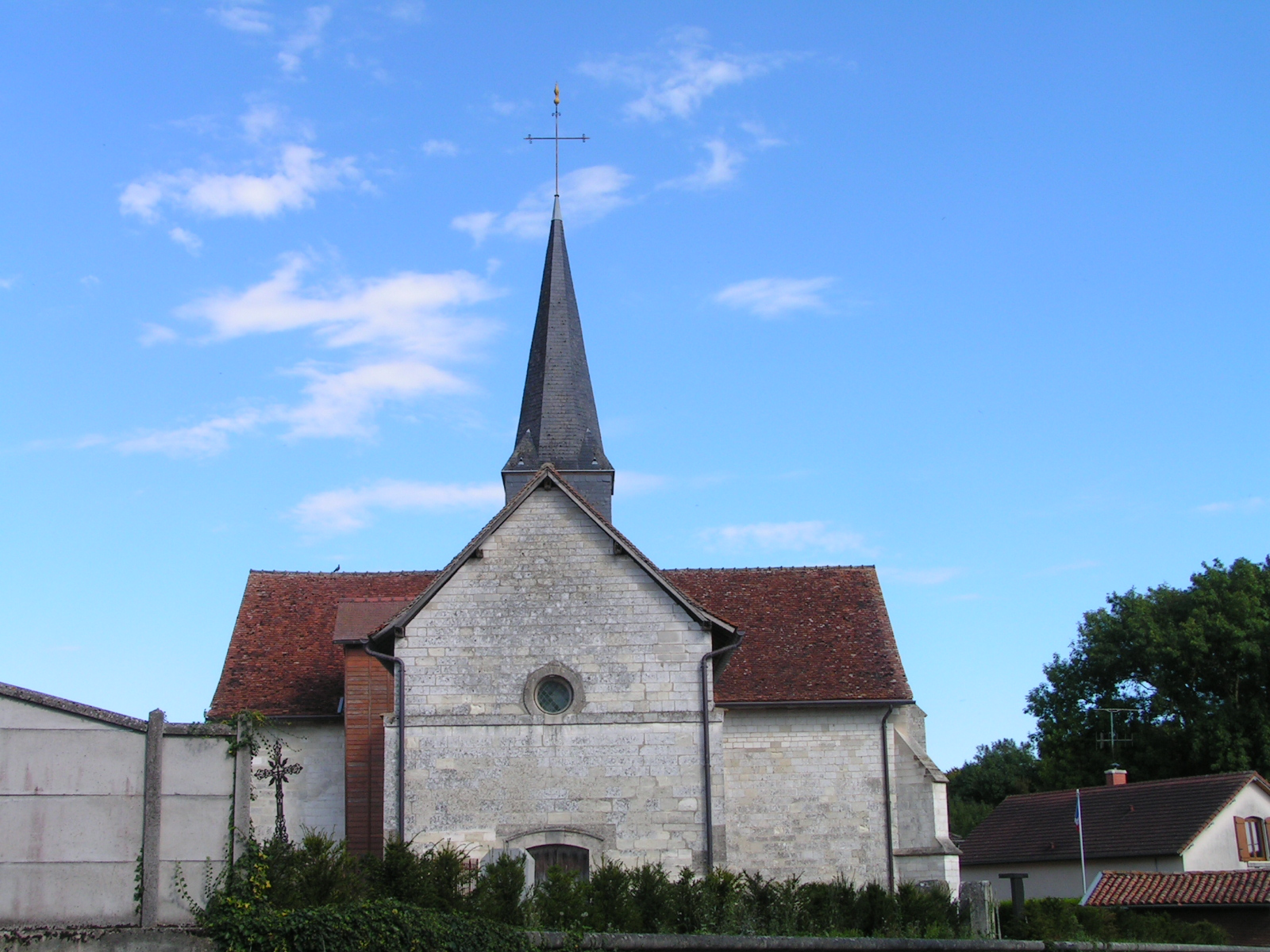
- The church in Gigny
- Location of Gigny-Bussy
- Location within France Location within Grand Est
- Coordinates: 48°36′25″N 4°34′17″E
- Country: France
- Region: Grand Est
- Department: Marne
- Arrondissement: Vitry-le-François
- Canton: Sermaize-les-Bains

Government
  - Mayor (2020–2026): Pascale Chevallot
- Area^{1}: 22.45 km^{2} (8.67 sq mi)
- Elevation: 220 m (720 ft)
- Population (2023): 221
  - Density: 9.84/km^{2} (25.5/sq mi)
- Time zone: UTC+01:00 (CET)
  - Summer (DST): UTC+02:00 (CEST)
- INSEE/Postal code: 51270 /51290
- ^{1} French Land Register data, which excludes lakes, ponds, glaciers > 1 km^{2} (0.386 sq mi or 247 acres) and river estuaries.

Gigny-Bussy (French pronunciation: [ʒiɲi bysi]) is a commune in the Marne department in north-eastern France. The commune was formed by the merger of the former communes of Gigny-aux-Bois and Bussy-aux-Bois in 1966.

== See also ==
- Communes of the Marne department
