= Villers-le-Sec, Marne =

Villers-le-Sec
- Commune
- Location of Villers-le-Sec
- Location within France Location within Grand Est
- Coordinates: 48°48′51″N 4°51′18″E
- Country: France
- Region: Grand Est
- Department: Marne
- Arrondissement: Vitry-le-François
- Canton: Sermaize-les-Bains

Government
  - Mayor (2020–2026): Christian Burgain
- Area^{1}: 5.8 km^{2} (2.2 sq mi)
- Elevation: 157 m (515 ft)
- Population (2023): 109
  - Density: 19/km^{2} (49/sq mi)
- Time zone: UTC+01:00 (CET)
  - Summer (DST): UTC+02:00 (CEST)
- INSEE/Postal code: 51635 /51250
- ^{1} French Land Register data, which excludes lakes, ponds, glaciers > 1 km^{2} (0.386 sq mi or 247 acres) and river estuaries.

Villers-le-Sec (French pronunciation: [vilɛʁ lə sɛk]) is a commune in the Marne department in northeastern France.

== See also ==
- Communes of the Marne department
