= Vavray-le-Grand =

- Commune
- Location of Vavray-le-Grand
- Location within France Location within Grand Est
- Coordinates: 48°47′57″N 4°42′27″E
- Country: France
- Region: Grand Est
- Department: Marne
- Arrondissement: Vitry-le-François
- Canton: Sermaize-les-Bains
- Intercommunality: Côtes de Champagne et Val de Saulx

Government
  - Mayor (2020–2026): Marie-Line Gironde
- Area^{1}: 7 km^{2} (2.7 sq mi)
- Elevation: 120 m (390 ft)
- Population (2023): 176
  - Density: 25/km^{2} (65/sq mi)
- Time zone: UTC+01:00 (CET)
  - Summer (DST): UTC+02:00 (CEST)
- INSEE/Postal code: 51601 /51300
- ^{1} French Land Register data, which excludes lakes, ponds, glaciers > 1 km^{2} (0.386 sq mi or 247 acres) and river estuaries.

Vavray-le-Grand (French pronunciation: [vavʁɛ lə ɡʁɑ̃]) is a commune in the Marne department in north-eastern France.

== See also ==
- Communes of the Marne department
