= Vanault-le-Châtel =

- Commune
- Location of Vanault-le-Châtel
- Location within France Location within Grand Est
- Coordinates: 48°51′56″N 4°43′35″E
- Country: France
- Region: Grand Est
- Department: Marne
- Arrondissement: Vitry-le-François
- Canton: Sermaize-les-Bains

Government
  - Mayor (2020–2026): Alain Depaquis
- Area^{1}: 34.78 km^{2} (13.43 sq mi)
- Elevation: 150 m (490 ft)
- Population (2023): 160
  - Density: 4.6/km^{2} (12/sq mi)
- Time zone: UTC+01:00 (CET)
  - Summer (DST): UTC+02:00 (CEST)
- INSEE/Postal code: 51589 /51330
- ^{1} French Land Register data, which excludes lakes, ponds, glaciers > 1 km^{2} (0.386 sq mi or 247 acres) and river estuaries.

Vanault-le-Châtel (French pronunciation: [vano lə ʃɑtɛl]) is a commune in the Marne department in north-eastern France.

== See also ==
- Communes of the Marne department
