= Saint-Jean-devant-Possesse =

- Commune
- Location of Saint-Jean-devant-Possesse
- Location within France Location within Grand Est
- Coordinates: 48°52′20″N 4°47′53″E
- Country: France
- Region: Grand Est
- Department: Marne
- Arrondissement: Vitry-le-François
- Canton: Sermaize-les-Bains
- Intercommunality: Côtes de Champagne et Val de Saulx

Government
  - Mayor (2020–2026): Thierry Dausseur
- Area^{1}: 5.33 km^{2} (2.06 sq mi)
- Population (2023): 31
  - Density: 5.8/km^{2} (15/sq mi)
- Time zone: UTC+01:00 (CET)
  - Summer (DST): UTC+02:00 (CEST)
- INSEE/Postal code: 51489 /51330
- ^{1} French Land Register data, which excludes lakes, ponds, glaciers > 1 km^{2} (0.386 sq mi or 247 acres) and river estuaries.

Saint-Jean-devant-Possesse (French pronunciation: [sɛ̃ ʒɑ̃ dəvɑ̃ pɔsɛs], literally Saint-Jean before Possesse) is a commune in the Marne department in north-eastern France.

== See also ==
- Communes of the Marne department
