= Bignicourt-sur-Saulx =

- Commune
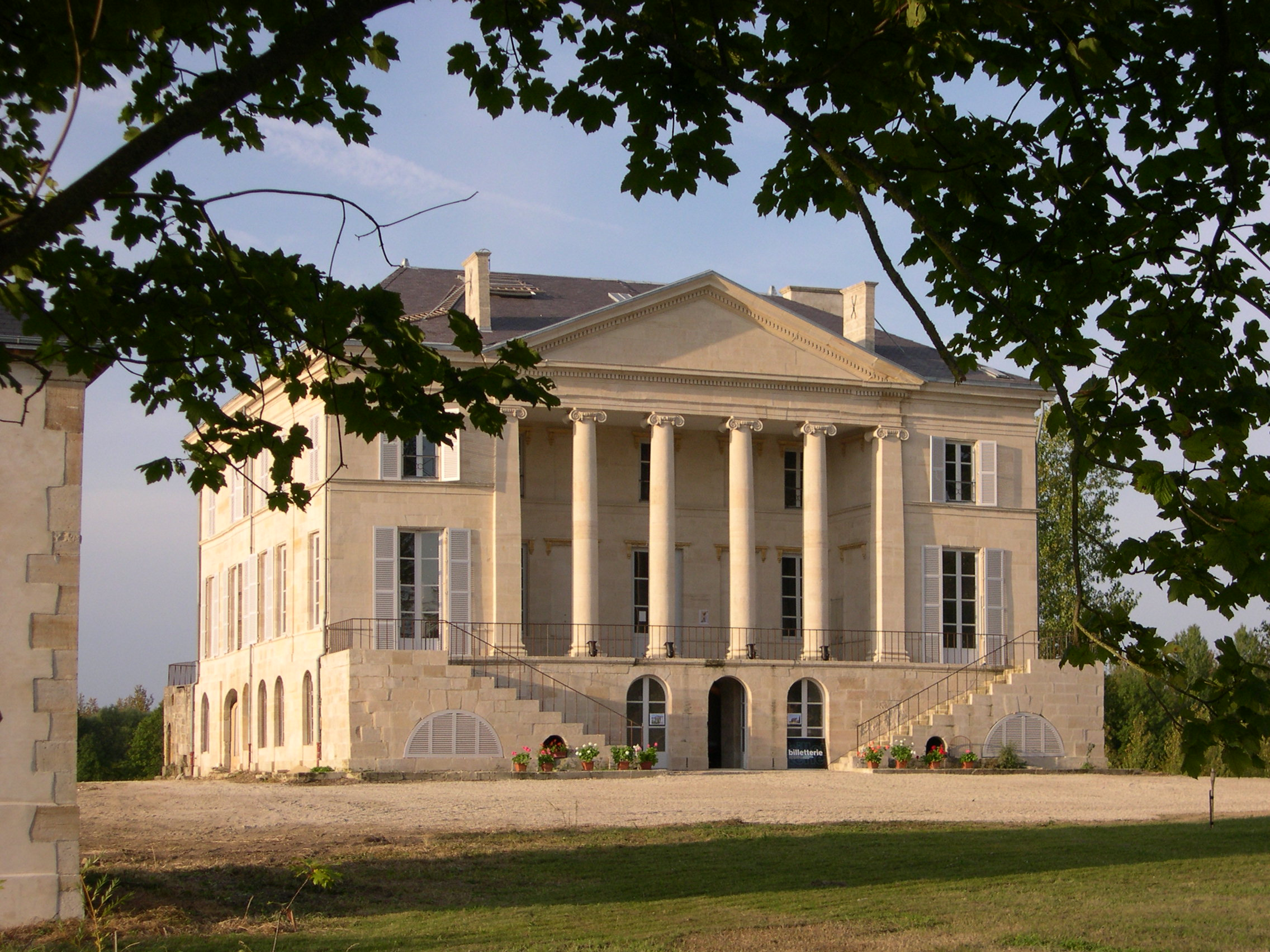
- The chateau in Bignicourt-sur-Saulx
- Location of Bignicourt-sur-Saulx
- Location within France Location within Grand Est
- Coordinates: 48°45′59″N 4°46′31″E
- Country: France
- Region: Grand Est
- Department: Marne
- Arrondissement: Vitry-le-François
- Canton: Sermaize-les-Bains

Government
  - Mayor (2020–2026): André Desanlis
- Area^{1}: 11.01 km^{2} (4.25 sq mi)
- Elevation: 108 m (354 ft)
- Population (2023): 153
  - Density: 13.9/km^{2} (36.0/sq mi)
- Time zone: UTC+01:00 (CET)
  - Summer (DST): UTC+02:00 (CEST)
- INSEE/Postal code: 51060 /51340
- ^{1} French Land Register data, which excludes lakes, ponds, glaciers > 1 km^{2} (0.386 sq mi or 247 acres) and river estuaries.

Bignicourt-sur-Saulx (French pronunciation: [biɲikuʁ syʁ so], literally Bignicourt on Saulx) is a commune of the Marne department in northeastern France.

== Population ==
Historical population
Year	Pop.	±% p.a.
1968	197	—
1975	182	−1.13%
1982	186	+0.31%
1990	193	+0.46%
1999	172	−1.27%
2007	157	−1.13%
2012	178	+2.54%
2017	190	+1.31%
2023	153	−3.55%
Source: INSEE

== See also ==
- Communes of the Marne department
