= Canton of Sermaize-les-Bains =

Coordinates: 48.78°N 4.91°E

The canton of Sermaize-les-Bains is an administrative division of the Marne department, northeastern France. It was created at the French canton reorganisation which came into effect in March 2015. Its seat is in Sermaize-les-Bains.

It consists of the following communes:

1. Alliancelles
2. Ambrières
3. Arrigny
4. Bassu
5. Bassuet
6. Bettancourt-la-Longue
7. Bignicourt-sur-Saulx
8. Blesme
9. Brandonvillers
10. Brusson
11. Le Buisson
12. Bussy-le-Repos
13. Changy
14. Charmont
15. Châtillon-sur-Broué
16. Cheminon
17. Cloyes-sur-Marne
18. Dompremy
19. Drosnay
20. Écollemont
21. Écriennes
22. Étrepy
23. Favresse
24. Giffaumont-Champaubert
25. Gigny-Bussy
26. Haussignémont
27. Hauteville
28. Heiltz-l'Évêque
29. Heiltz-le-Hutier
30. Heiltz-le-Maurupt
31. Isle-sur-Marne
32. Jussecourt-Minecourt
33. Landricourt
34. Larzicourt
35. Lisse-en-Champagne
36. Luxémont-et-Villotte
37. Matignicourt-Goncourt
38. Maurupt-le-Montois
39. Merlaut
40. Moncetz-l'Abbaye
41. Norrois
42. Orconte
43. Outines
44. Outrepont
45. Pargny-sur-Saulx
46. Plichancourt
47. Ponthion
48. Possesse
49. Reims-la-Brûlée
50. Saint-Amand-sur-Fion
51. Sainte-Marie-du-Lac-Nuisement
52. Saint-Eulien
53. Saint-Jean-devant-Possesse
54. Saint-Lumier-en-Champagne
55. Saint-Lumier-la-Populeuse
56. Saint-Quentin-les-Marais
57. Saint-Remy-en-Bouzemont-Saint-Genest-et-Isson
58. Saint-Vrain
59. Sapignicourt
60. Scrupt
61. Sermaize-les-Bains
62. Sogny-en-l'Angle
63. Thiéblemont-Farémont
64. Trois-Fontaines-l'Abbaye
65. Val-de-Vière
66. Vanault-le-Châtel
67. Vanault-les-Dames
68. Vauclerc
69. Vavray-le-Grand
70. Vavray-le-Petit
71. Vernancourt
72. Villers-le-Sec
73. Vitry-en-Perthois
74. Vouillers
75. Vroil
