= Châtillon-sur-Broué =

- Commune
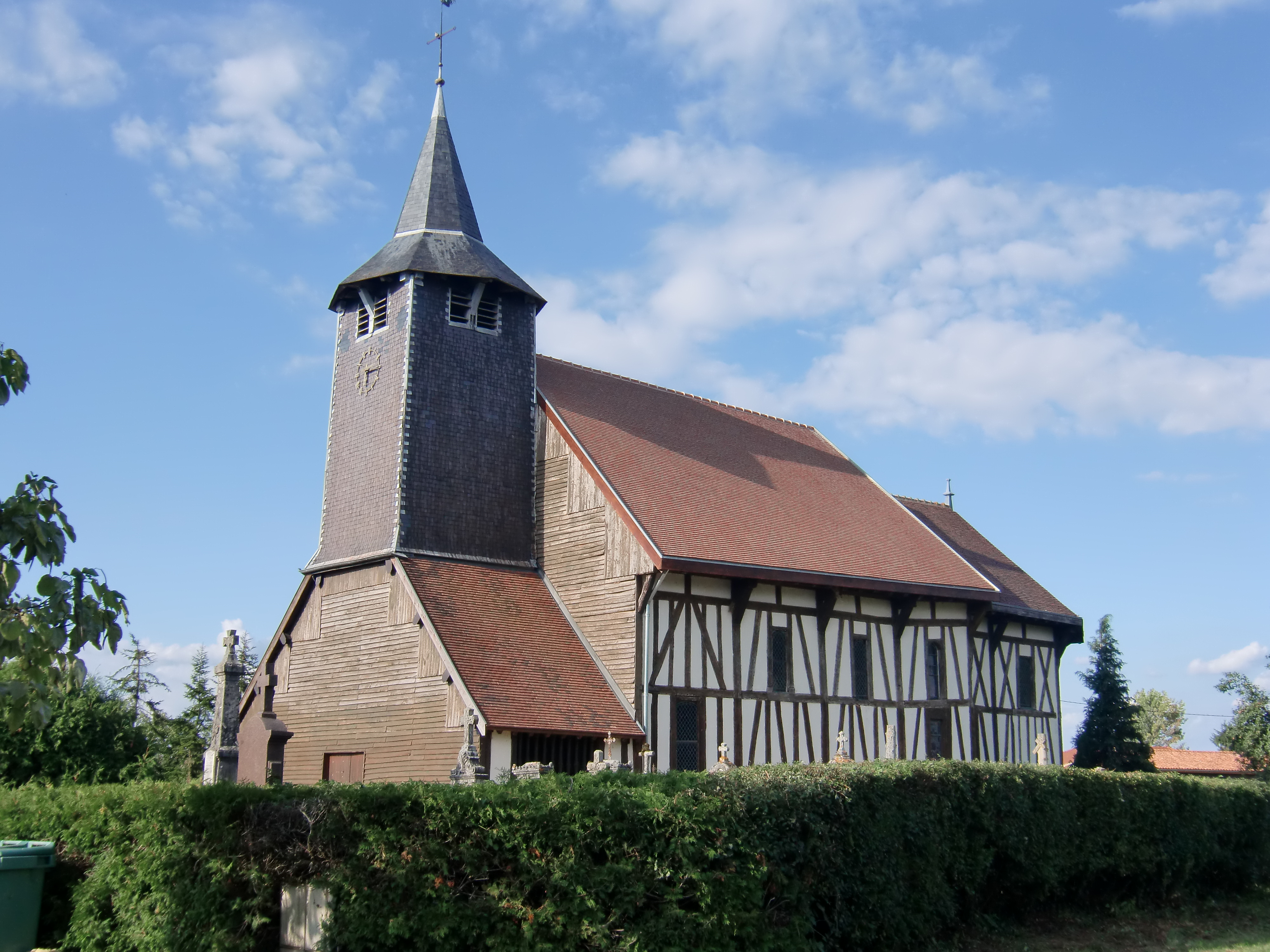
- The church in Châtillon-sur-Broué
- Location of Châtillon-sur-Broué
- Location within France Location within Grand Est
- Coordinates: 48°32′48″N 4°42′14″E
- Country: France
- Region: Grand Est
- Department: Marne
- Arrondissement: Vitry-le-François
- Canton: Sermaize-les-Bains

Government
  - Mayor (2020–2026): Joël Reser
- Area^{1}: 6.63 km^{2} (2.56 sq mi)
- Elevation: 136 m (446 ft)
- Population (2023): 90
  - Density: 14/km^{2} (35/sq mi)
- Time zone: UTC+01:00 (CET)
  - Summer (DST): UTC+02:00 (CEST)
- INSEE/Postal code: 51135 /51290
- ^{1} French Land Register data, which excludes lakes, ponds, glaciers > 1 km^{2} (0.386 sq mi or 247 acres) and river estuaries.

Châtillon-sur-Broué (French pronunciation: [ʃatijɔ̃ syʁ bʁue]) is a commune in the Marne department in north-eastern France.

== See also ==
- Communes of the Marne department
