= Drosnay =

- Commune
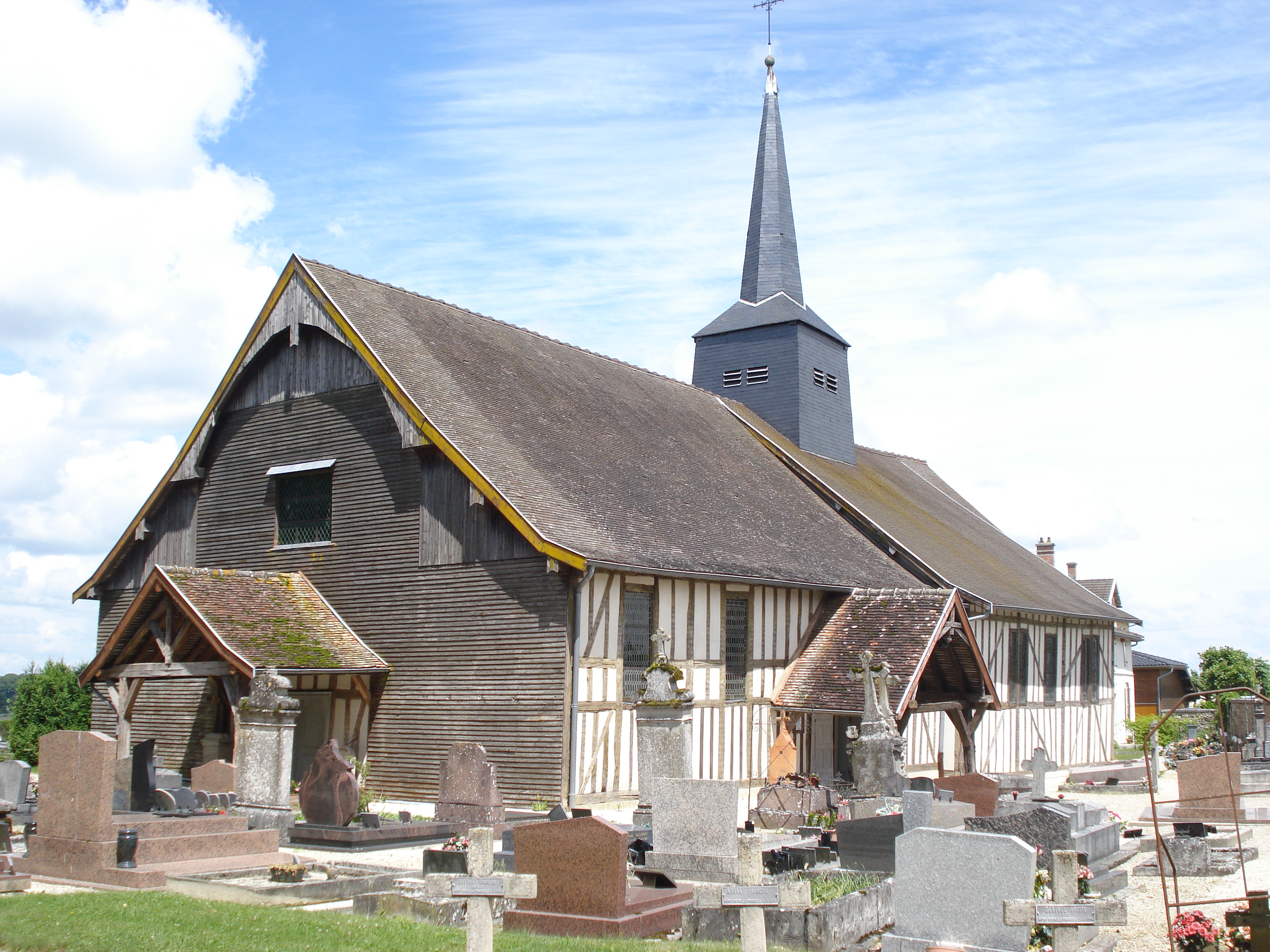
- The church in Drosnay

- Coat of arms
- Location of Drosnay
- Location within France Location within Grand Est
- Coordinates: 48°34′30″N 4°36′50″E
- Country: France
- Region: Grand Est
- Department: Marne
- Arrondissement: Vitry-le-François
- Canton: Sermaize-les-Bains

Government
  - Mayor (2020–2026): Emmanuel Le Roy
- Area^{1}: 18.62 km^{2} (7.19 sq mi)
- Elevation: 130 m (430 ft)
- Population (2023): 194
  - Density: 10.4/km^{2} (27.0/sq mi)
- Time zone: UTC+01:00 (CET)
  - Summer (DST): UTC+02:00 (CEST)
- INSEE/Postal code: 51219 /51290
- ^{1} French Land Register data, which excludes lakes, ponds, glaciers > 1 km^{2} (0.386 sq mi or 247 acres) and river estuaries.

Drosnay (French pronunciation: [dʁonɛ]) is a commune in the Marne department in north-eastern France.

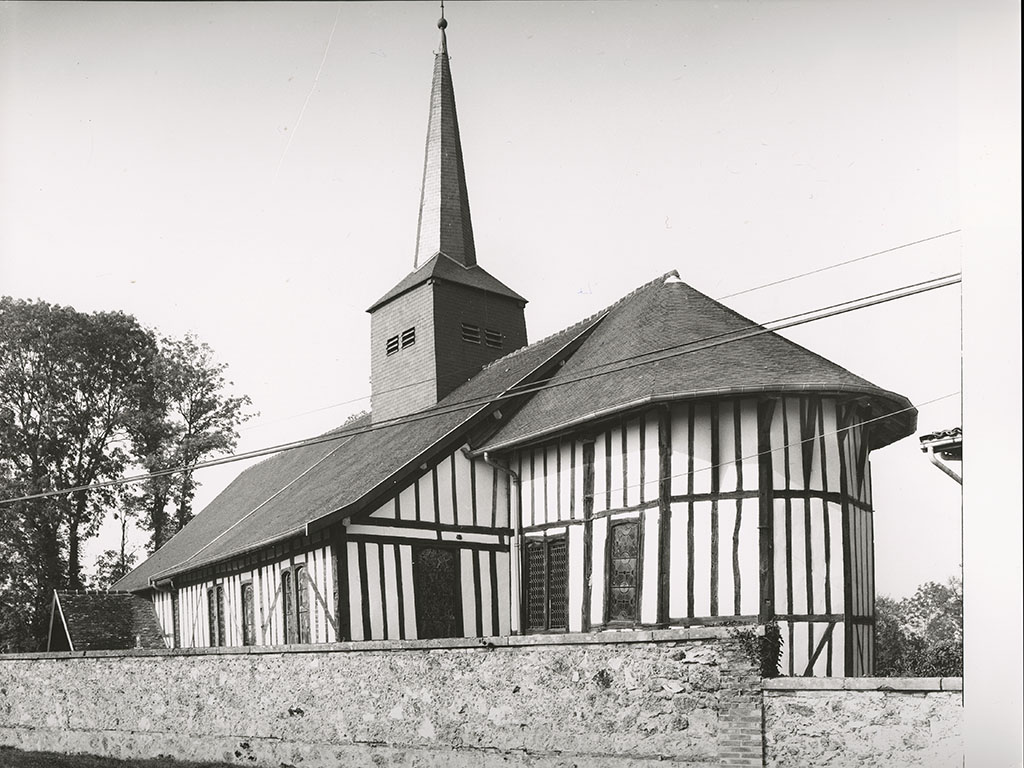
Vue extérieur de l'abside de l'Eglise de Notre-Dame-de-Drosnay

Drosnay's 17th century half-timbered church was destroyed by an electrical fire on 7 July 2023. Among the art destroyed inside the structure were 16th century stained glass windows, a 17th century altarpiece, and 18th century paneling. It was classified as a historic monument by the French government in 1982.

== See also ==
- Communes of the Marne department
