= Lisse-en-Champagne =

- Commune
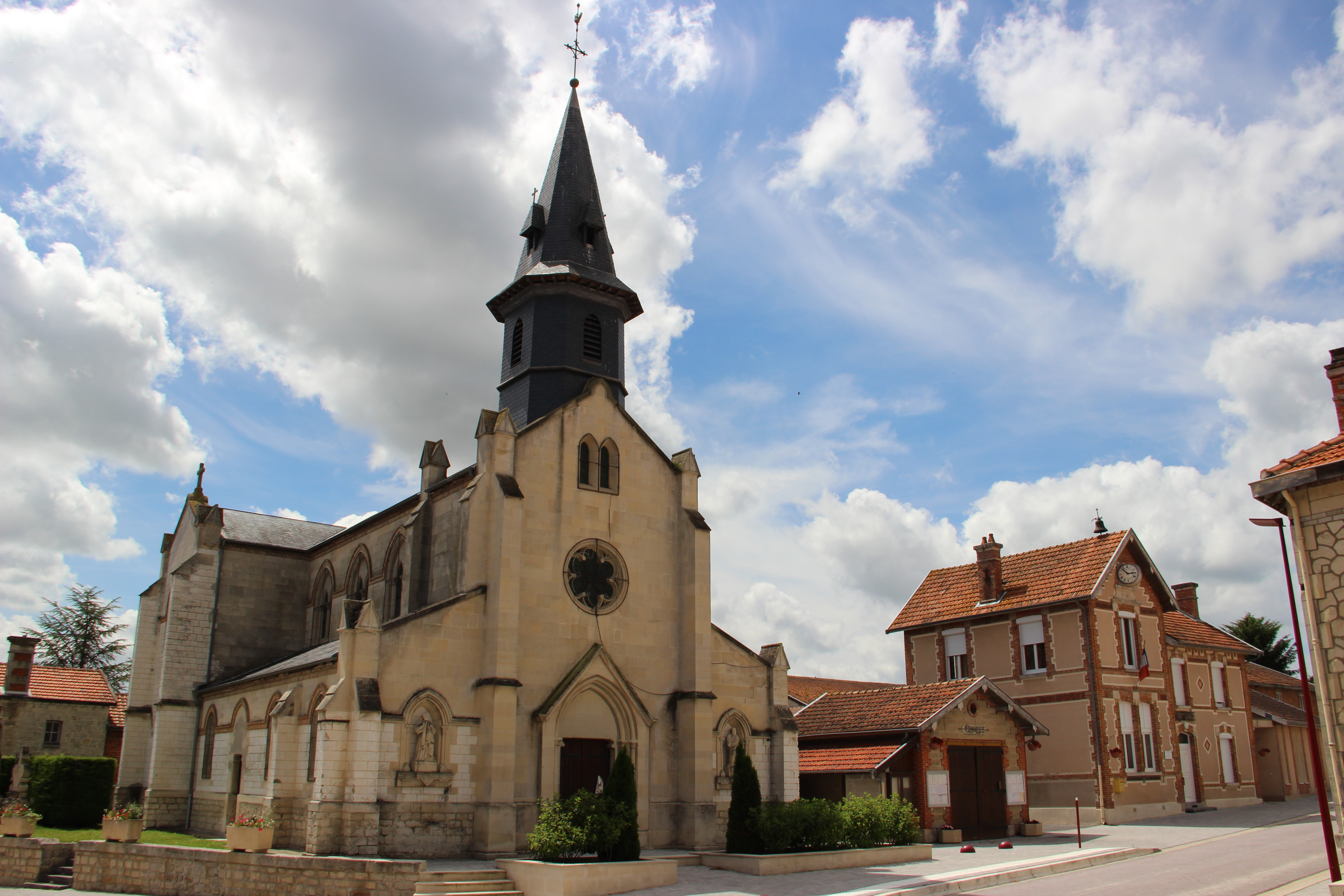
- The church and town hall in Lisse-en-Champagne
- Location of Lisse-en-Champagne
- Location within France Location within Grand Est
- Coordinates: 48°48′50″N 4°38′35″E
- Country: France
- Region: Grand Est
- Department: Marne
- Arrondissement: Vitry-le-François
- Canton: Sermaize-les-Bains
- Intercommunality: Côtes de Champagne et Val de Saulx

Government
  - Mayor (2020–2026): Isabelle Iva
- Area^{1}: 8.29 km^{2} (3.20 sq mi)
- Elevation: 126 m (413 ft)
- Population (2023): 104
  - Density: 12.5/km^{2} (32.5/sq mi)
- Time zone: UTC+01:00 (CET)
  - Summer (DST): UTC+02:00 (CEST)
- INSEE/Postal code: 51325 /51300
- ^{1} French Land Register data, which excludes lakes, ponds, glaciers > 1 km^{2} (0.386 sq mi or 247 acres) and river estuaries.

Lisse-en-Champagne (French pronunciation: [lis ɑ̃ ʃɑ̃paɲ]) is a commune in the Marne department in north-eastern France.

== See also ==
- Communes of the Marne department
