= Saint-Quentin-les-Marais =

- Commune
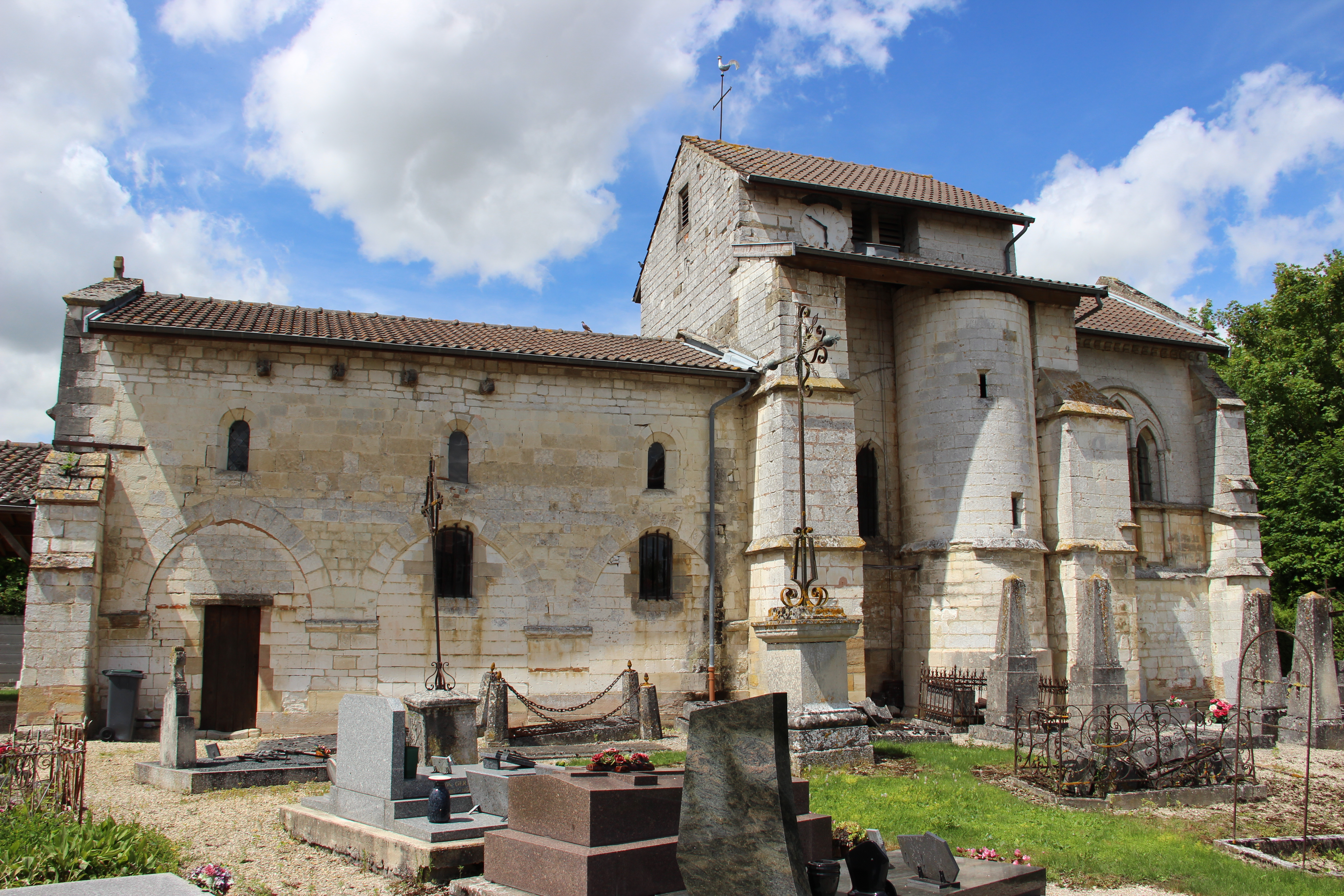
- The church in Saint-Quentin-les-Marais
- Location of Saint-Quentin-les-Marais
- Location within France Location within Grand Est
- Coordinates: 48°46′55″N 4°38′38″E
- Country: France
- Region: Grand Est
- Department: Marne
- Arrondissement: Vitry-le-François
- Canton: Sermaize-les-Bains

Government
  - Mayor (2020–2026): Patrice Cautrupt
- Area^{1}: 6.56 km^{2} (2.53 sq mi)
- Elevation: 150 m (490 ft)
- Population (2023): 118
  - Density: 18.0/km^{2} (46.6/sq mi)
- Time zone: UTC+01:00 (CET)
  - Summer (DST): UTC+02:00 (CEST)
- INSEE/Postal code: 51510 /51300
- ^{1} French Land Register data, which excludes lakes, ponds, glaciers > 1 km^{2} (0.386 sq mi or 247 acres) and river estuaries.

Saint-Quentin-les-Marais (French pronunciation: [sɛ̃ kɑ̃tɛ̃ le maʁɛ]) is a commune in the Marne department in north-eastern France.

== See also ==
- Communes of the Marne department
