= Isle-sur-Marne =

- Commune
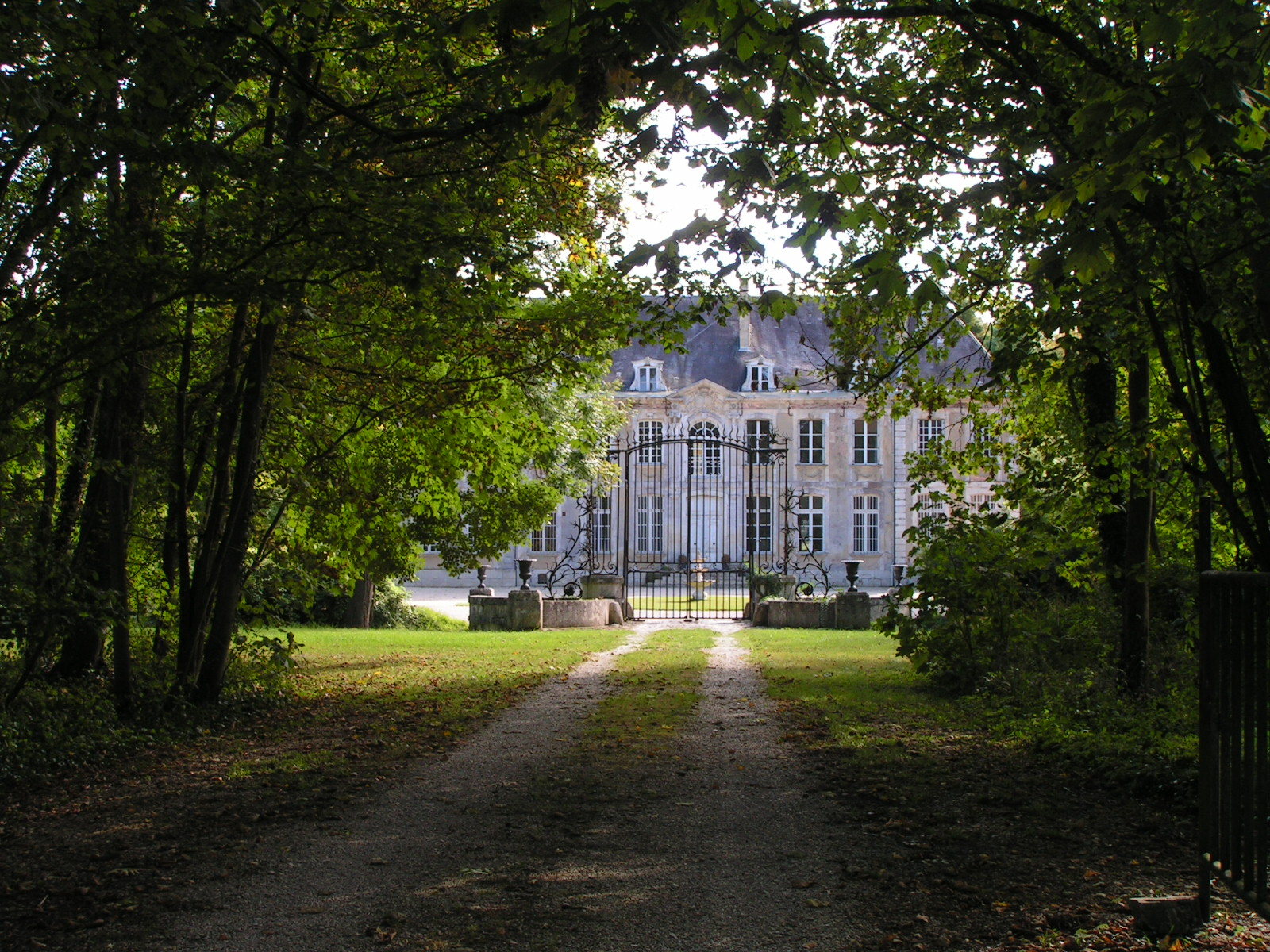
- The chateau in Isle-sur-Marne

- Coat of arms
- Location of Isle-sur-Marne
- Location within France Location within Grand Est
- Coordinates: 48°38′29″N 4°41′21″E
- Country: France
- Region: Grand Est
- Department: Marne
- Arrondissement: Vitry-le-François
- Canton: Sermaize-les-Bains
- Intercommunality: Perthois-Bocage et Der

Government
  - Mayor (2020–2026): Philippe Landroit
- Area^{1}: 5.47 km^{2} (2.11 sq mi)
- Elevation: 116 m (381 ft)
- Population (2023): 96
  - Density: 18/km^{2} (45/sq mi)
- Time zone: UTC+01:00 (CET)
  - Summer (DST): UTC+02:00 (CEST)
- INSEE/Postal code: 51300 /51290
- ^{1} French Land Register data, which excludes lakes, ponds, glaciers > 1 km^{2} (0.386 sq mi or 247 acres) and river estuaries.

Isle-sur-Marne (French pronunciation: [il syʁ maʁn], literally Isle on Marne) is a commune in the Marne department in north-eastern France.

== See also ==
- Communes of the Marne department
