= Brandonvillers =

- Commune
- Coat of arms
- Location of Brandonvillers
- Location within France Location within Grand Est
- Coordinates: 48°35′34″N 4°33′34″E
- Country: France
- Region: Grand Est
- Department: Marne
- Arrondissement: Vitry-le-François
- Canton: Sermaize-les-Bains

Government
  - Mayor (2020–2026): Jean-Luc Herveux
- Area^{1}: 11.69 km^{2} (4.51 sq mi)
- Elevation: 118 m (387 ft)
- Population (2023): 191
  - Density: 16.3/km^{2} (42.3/sq mi)
- Time zone: UTC+01:00 (CET)
  - Summer (DST): UTC+02:00 (CEST)
- INSEE/Postal code: 51080 /51290
- ^{1} French Land Register data, which excludes lakes, ponds, glaciers > 1 km^{2} (0.386 sq mi or 247 acres) and river estuaries.

Brandonvillers is a commune in the Marne department in northeastern France.

== Population ==
Historical population
Year	Pop.	±% p.a.
1968	131	—
1975	119	−1.36%
1982	121	+0.24%
1990	149	+2.64%
1999	126	−1.85%
2007	154	+2.54%
2012	167	+1.63%
2017	184	+1.96%
2023	191	+0.62%
Source: INSEE

== See also ==
- Communes of the Marne department
