= Reims-la-Brûlée =

- Commune
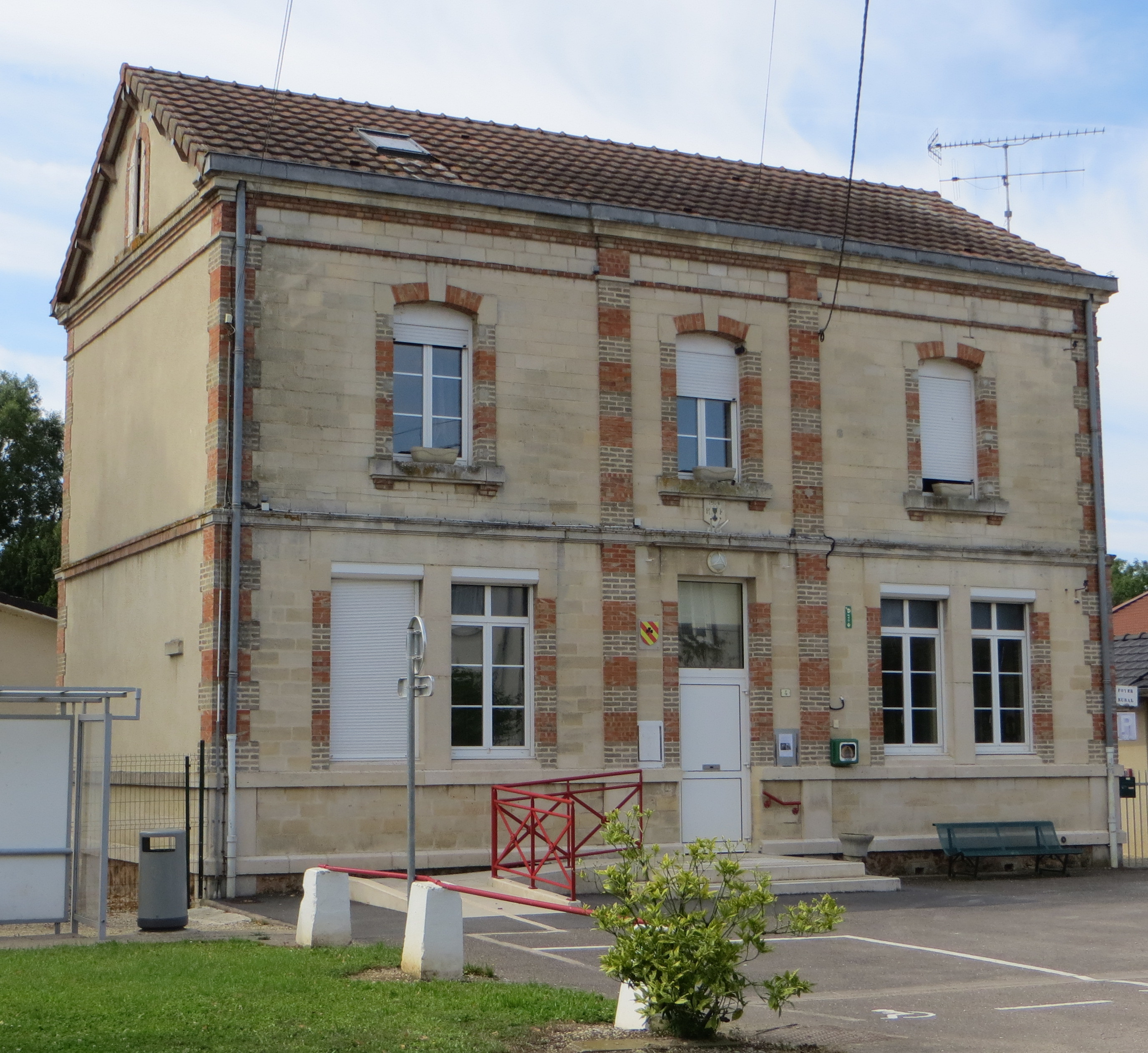
- Town hall
- Location of Reims-la-Brûlée
- Location within France Location within Grand Est
- Coordinates: 48°43′10″N 4°40′10″E
- Country: France
- Region: Grand Est
- Department: Marne
- Arrondissement: Vitry-le-François
- Canton: Sermaize-les-Bains
- Intercommunality: Côtes de Champagne et Val de Saulx

Government
  - Mayor (2020–2026): Joël Lagneaux
- Area^{1}: 6.51 km^{2} (2.51 sq mi)
- Elevation: 112 m (367 ft)
- Population (2023): 214
  - Density: 32.9/km^{2} (85.1/sq mi)
- Time zone: UTC+01:00 (CET)
  - Summer (DST): UTC+02:00 (CEST)
- INSEE/Postal code: 51455 /51300
- ^{1} French Land Register data, which excludes lakes, ponds, glaciers > 1 km^{2} (0.386 sq mi or 247 acres) and river estuaries.

Reims-la-Brûlée (French pronunciation: [ʁɛ̃s la bʁyle]) is a commune in the Marne department in north-eastern France.

== See also ==
- Communes of the Marne department
