= Sermaize-les-Bains =

- Commune
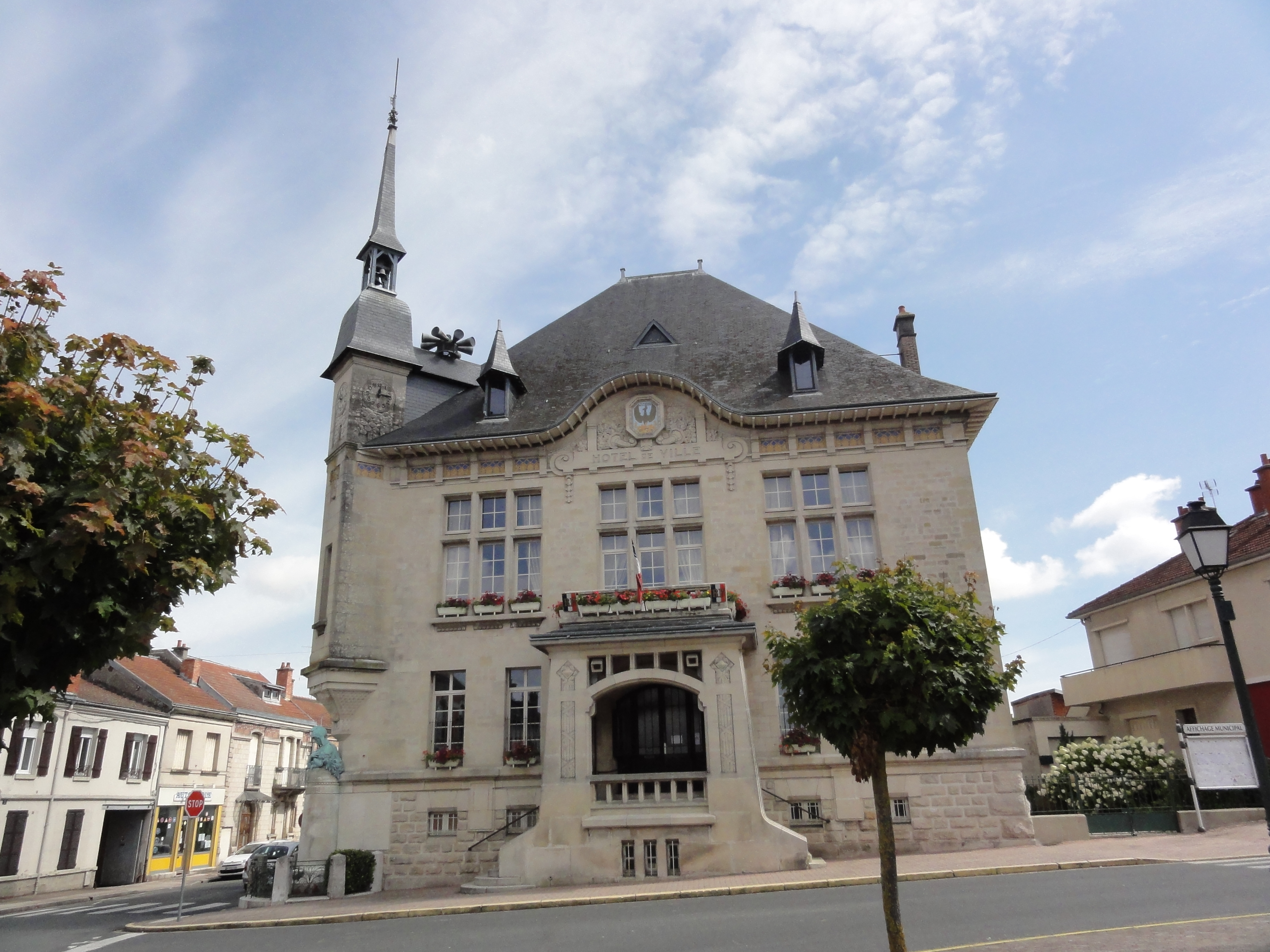
- The town hall in Sermaize-les-Bains

- Coat of arms
- Location of Sermaize-les-Bains
- Location within France Location within Grand Est
- Coordinates: 48°47′04″N 4°54′43″E
- Country: France
- Region: Grand Est
- Department: Marne
- Arrondissement: Vitry-le-François
- Canton: Sermaize-les-Bains
- Intercommunality: Côtes de Champagne et Val de Saulx

Government
  - Mayor (2020–2026): Saïd Yacoubi
- Area^{1}: 17.69 km^{2} (6.83 sq mi)
- Elevation: 131 m (430 ft)
- Population (2023): 1,742
  - Density: 98.47/km^{2} (255.0/sq mi)
- Time zone: UTC+01:00 (CET)
  - Summer (DST): UTC+02:00 (CEST)
- INSEE/Postal code: 51531 /51250
- ^{1} French Land Register data, which excludes lakes, ponds, glaciers > 1 km^{2} (0.386 sq mi or 247 acres) and river estuaries.

Sermaize-les-Bains (French pronunciation: [sɛʁmɛz le bɛ̃]) is a commune in the Marne department in north-eastern France.

== See also ==
- Communes of the Marne department
