= Heiltz-le-Hutier =

- Commune
- Coat of arms
- Location of Heiltz-le-Hutier
- Location within France Location within Grand Est
- Coordinates: 48°41′21″N 4°46′07″E
- Country: France
- Region: Grand Est
- Department: Marne
- Arrondissement: Vitry-le-François
- Canton: Sermaize-les-Bains
- Intercommunality: Perthois-Bocage et Der

Government
  - Mayor (2020–2026): Corine Gérard
- Area^{1}: 10.84 km^{2} (4.19 sq mi)
- Elevation: 126 m (413 ft)
- Population (2023): 233
  - Density: 21.5/km^{2} (55.7/sq mi)
- Time zone: UTC+01:00 (CET)
  - Summer (DST): UTC+02:00 (CEST)
- INSEE/Postal code: 51288 /51300
- ^{1} French Land Register data, which excludes lakes, ponds, glaciers > 1 km^{2} (0.386 sq mi or 247 acres) and river estuaries.

Heiltz-le-Hutier (，French pronunciation: [ɛls lə ytje]) is a commune in the Marne department in north-eastern France.

== See also ==
- Communes of the Marne department
