= Sogny-en-l'Angle =

- Commune
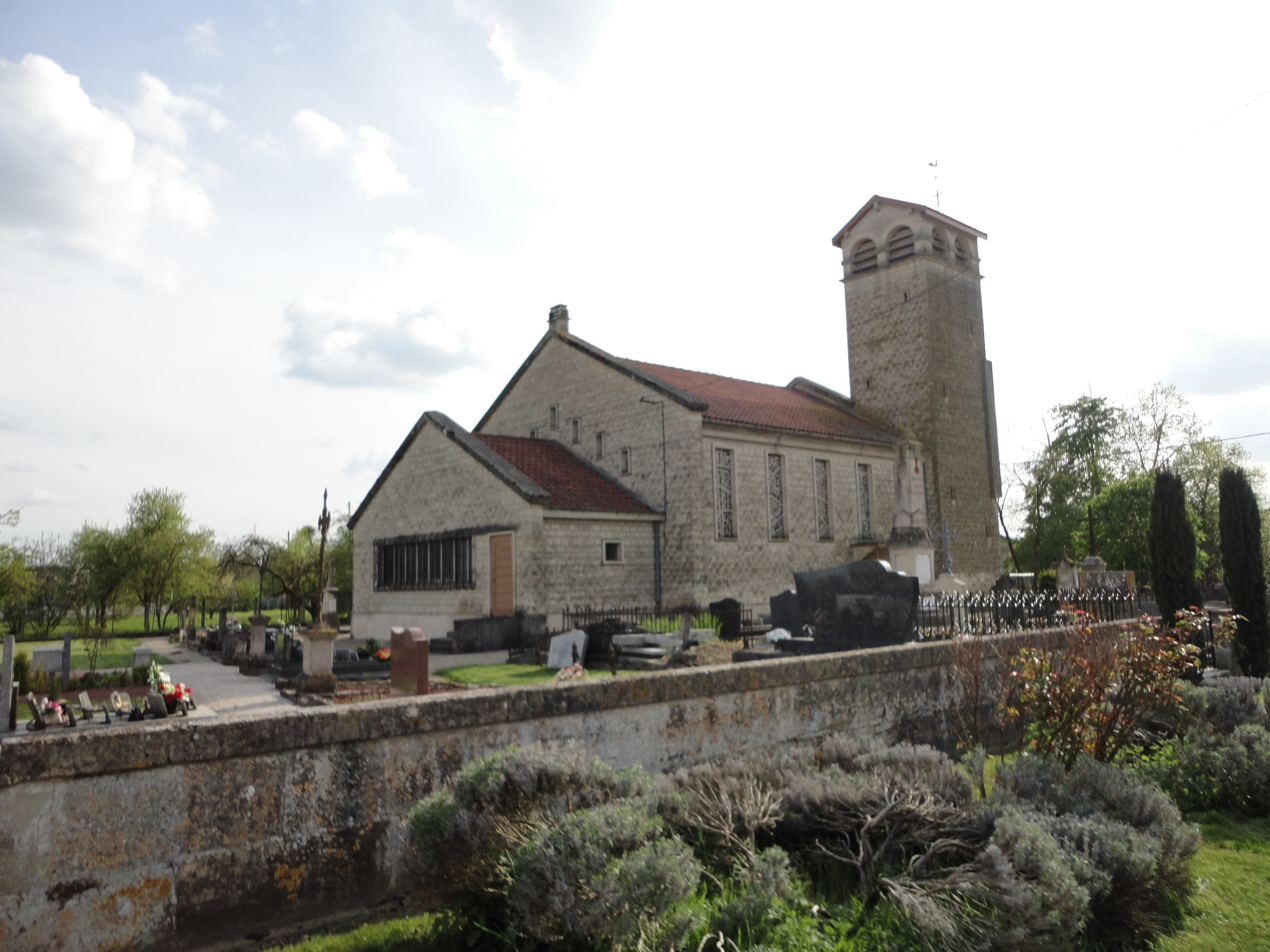
- The church in Sogny-en-l'Angle
- Location of Sogny-en-l'Angle
- Location within France Location within Grand Est
- Coordinates: 48°48′46″N 4°48′10″E
- Country: France
- Region: Grand Est
- Department: Marne
- Arrondissement: Vitry-le-François
- Canton: Sermaize-les-Bains
- Intercommunality: Côtes de Champagne et Val de Saulx

Government
  - Mayor (2020–2026): Michel Linard
- Area^{1}: 6.66 km^{2} (2.57 sq mi)
- Elevation: 116 m (381 ft)
- Population (2023): 73
  - Density: 11/km^{2} (28/sq mi)
- Time zone: UTC+01:00 (CET)
  - Summer (DST): UTC+02:00 (CEST)
- INSEE/Postal code: 51539 /51340
- ^{1} French Land Register data, which excludes lakes, ponds, glaciers > 1 km^{2} (0.386 sq mi or 247 acres) and river estuaries.

Sogny-en-l'Angle (French pronunciation: [sɔɲi ɑ̃ lɑ̃ɡl]) is a commune in the Marne department in north-eastern France.

== See also ==
- Communes of the Marne department
