= Dompremy =

- Commune
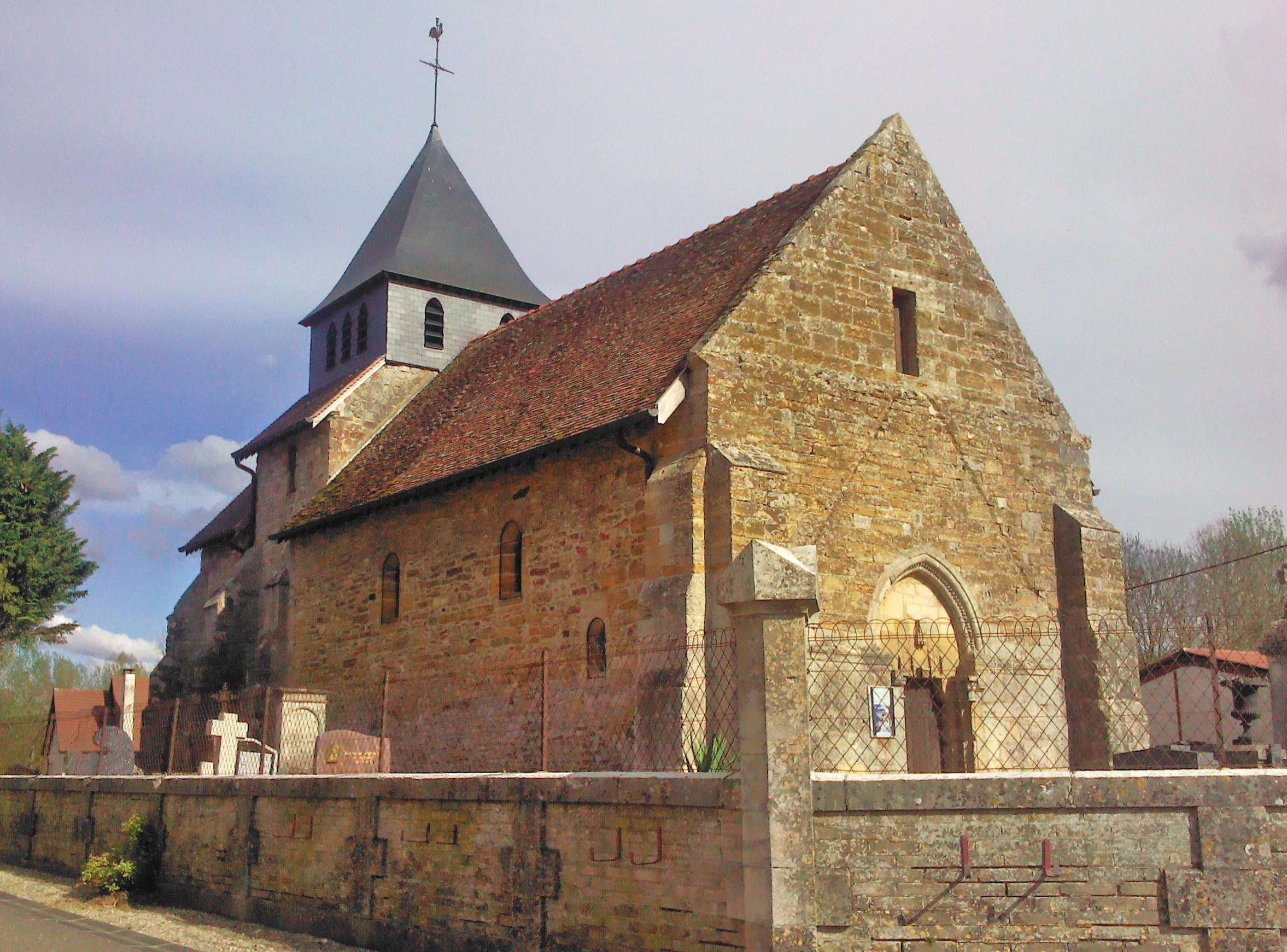
- The church in Dompremy
- Location of Dompremy
- Location within France Location within Grand Est
- Coordinates: 48°43′45″N 4°44′29″E
- Country: France
- Region: Grand Est
- Department: Marne
- Arrondissement: Vitry-le-François
- Canton: Sermaize-les-Bains
- Intercommunality: Perthois-Bocage et Der

Government
  - Mayor (2020–2026): Philippe Thiebaux
- Area^{1}: 3.65 km^{2} (1.41 sq mi)
- Elevation: 110 m (360 ft)
- Population (2023): 116
  - Density: 31.8/km^{2} (82.3/sq mi)
- Time zone: UTC+01:00 (CET)
  - Summer (DST): UTC+02:00 (CEST)
- INSEE/Postal code: 51215 /51300
- ^{1} French Land Register data, which excludes lakes, ponds, glaciers > 1 km^{2} (0.386 sq mi or 247 acres) and river estuaries.

Dompremy (French pronunciation: [dɔ̃pʁəmi]) is a commune located in the Marne department in north-eastern France.

== See also ==
- Communes of the Marne department
