= Charmont, Marne =

Charmont
- Commune
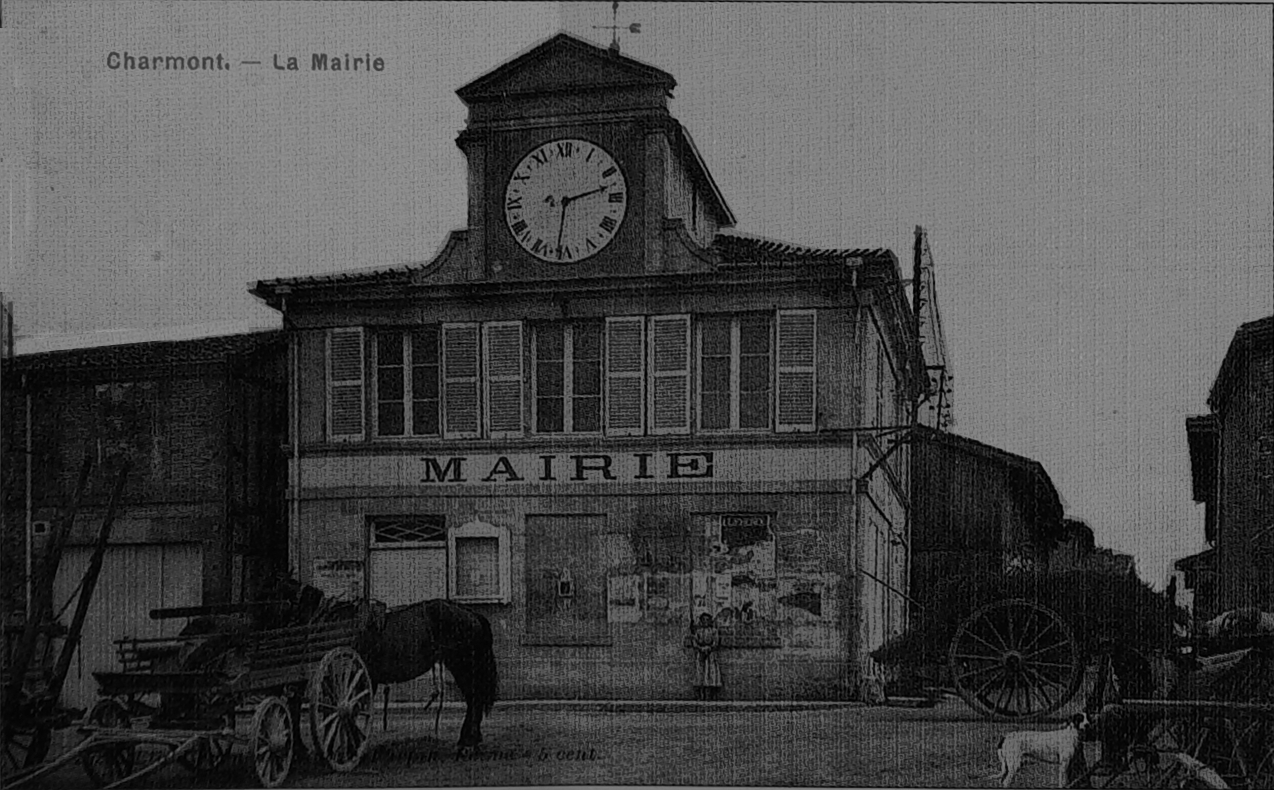
- The town hall in Charmont

- Coat of arms
- Location of Charmont
- Location within France Location within Grand Est
- Coordinates: 48°52′16″N 4°52′05″E
- Country: France
- Region: Grand Est
- Department: Marne
- Arrondissement: Vitry-le-François
- Canton: Sermaize-les-Bains
- Intercommunality: Côtes de Champagne et Val de Saulx

Government
  - Mayor (2020–2026): Isabelle Larose
- Area^{1}: 22.79 km^{2} (8.80 sq mi)
- Population (2023): 232
  - Density: 10.2/km^{2} (26.4/sq mi)
- Time zone: UTC+01:00 (CET)
  - Summer (DST): UTC+02:00 (CEST)
- INSEE/Postal code: 51130 /51330
- ^{1} French Land Register data, which excludes lakes, ponds, glaciers > 1 km^{2} (0.386 sq mi or 247 acres) and river estuaries.

Charmont (French pronunciation: [ʃaʁmɔ̃]) is a commune in the Marne department in north-eastern France.

== See also ==
- Communes of the Marne department
