= Brusson, Marne =

Brusson
- Commune
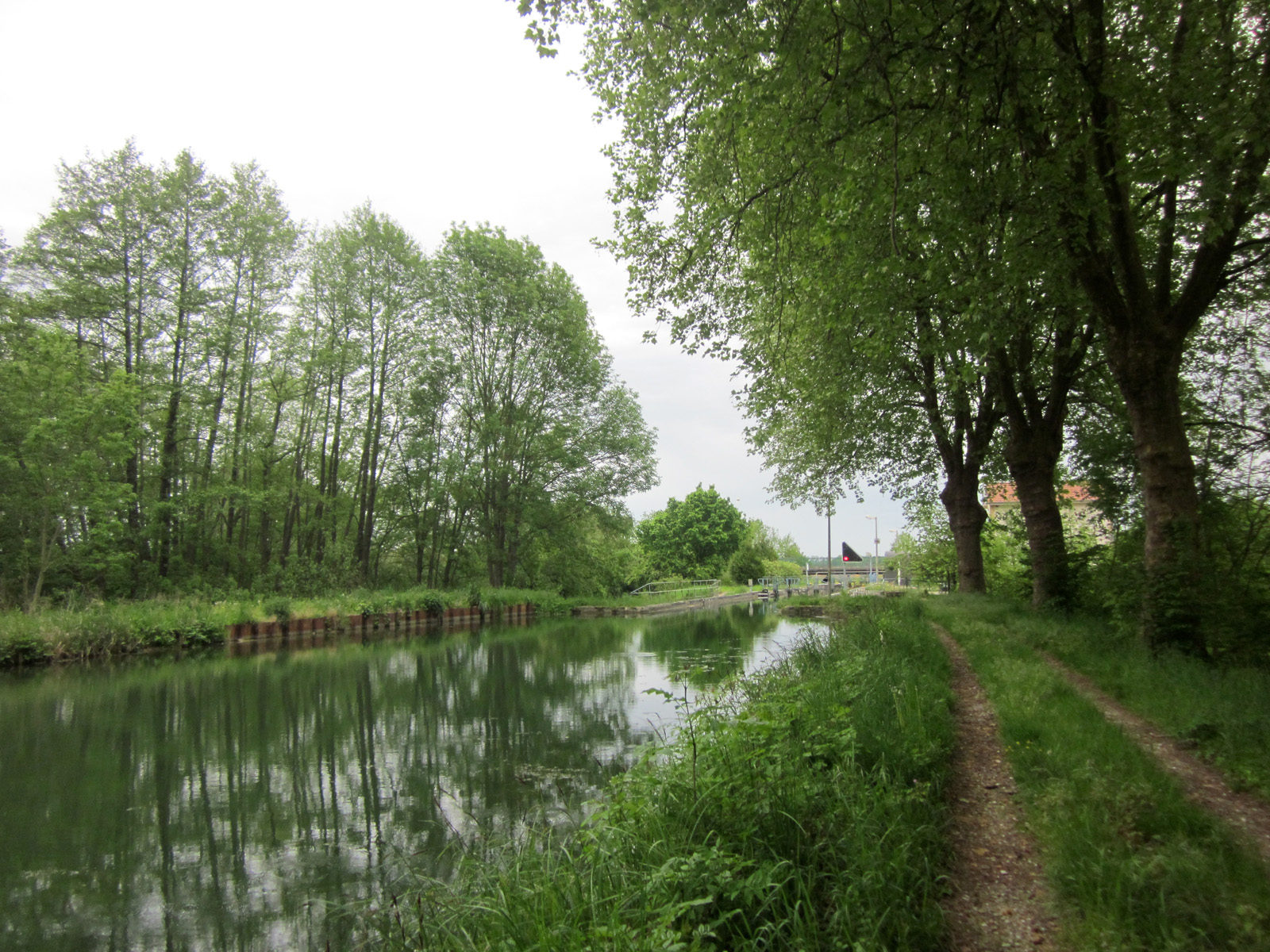
- The Marne Canal in Brusson

- Coat of arms
- Location of Brusson
- Location within France Location within Grand Est
- Coordinates: 48°45′00″N 4°42′15″E
- Country: France
- Region: Grand Est
- Department: Marne
- Arrondissement: Vitry-le-François
- Canton: Sermaize-les-Bains

Government
  - Mayor (2020–2026): Pascal Tramontana
- Area^{1}: 4.86 km^{2} (1.88 sq mi)
- Elevation: 106 m (348 ft)
- Population (2023): 188
  - Density: 38.7/km^{2} (100/sq mi)
- Time zone: UTC+01:00 (CET)
  - Summer (DST): UTC+02:00 (CEST)
- INSEE/Postal code: 51094 /51300
- ^{1} French Land Register data, which excludes lakes, ponds, glaciers > 1 km^{2} (0.386 sq mi or 247 acres) and river estuaries.

Brusson (French pronunciation: [bʁysɔ̃]) is a commune in the Marne department in northeastern France.

== Population ==
Historical population
Year	Pop.	±% p.a.
1968	155	—
1975	146	−0.85%
1982	204	+4.89%
1990	196	−0.50%
1999	174	−1.31%
2007	211	+2.44%
2012	208	−0.29%
2017	184	−2.42%
2023	188	+0.36%
Source: INSEE

== See also ==
- Communes of the Marne department
