= René Doumer =

French World War I flying ace

- Born: October 31, 1887; Laon, France
- Died: April 26, 1917 (aged 29); North of Brimont, France
- Relatives: Paul Doumer; Blanche Richel Doumer
- Military career
- Allegiance: France
- Branch: Aviation
- Service years: 1908 - 1917
- Rank: Capitaine
- Unit: Escadrille 64
- Commands: Escadrille 76
- Awards: Legion d'Honneur; Croix de Guerre

Capitaine René Doumer (October 31, 1887 – April 26, 1917) was a French World War I flying ace credited with seven confirmed aerial victories and four unconfirmed combat claims.

== Biography ==
René Doumer, born on 31 October 1887, was one of the eight children of Paul Doumer (president of France 1931–1932) and Blanche Doumer (née Richel). He was a professional lieutenant when the First World War began, he had been a chasseur since 1908. He was seriously wounded on 17 September 1914 in circumstances that won him the Légion d'honneur. After his recovery, he transferred to aviation. His first assignment was to fly a Caudron for Escadrille 64. He scored his first two victories with the unit on 19 and 30 March 1916. He then transferred to a Nieuport fighter unit, Escadrille 76. He would rack up five more wins between 23 October 1916 and 28 March 1917. He would also succeed to command of Escadrille 76. He was killed by Erich Hahn on 26 April 1917.

== List of aerial victories ==
See also Aerial victory standards of World War I

No.	Date/time	Location
1	19 March 1916	Pontfaverger-Moronvilliers
2	30 March 1916	Sainte-Marie-à-Py
3	23 October 1916	Azannes
4	23 October 1916	Romagne
5	23 January 1917	Craonne
6	17 March 1917	Corbeny
7	28 March 1917	Berméricourt
