= Pouillon =

Pouillon may refer to the following places in France:

- Pouillon, Landes, a commune in the Landes department
- Pouillon, Marne, a commune in the Marne department

It may also be a French surname, which may refer to:

- Fernand Pouillon modernist architect
- Jean Pouillon anthropologist and Africanist
- Jean Pouillon (1915-2002) ethnologist
- Nora Pouillon (born 1943), Austrian chef
