= Cauroy-lès-Hermonville =

- Commune
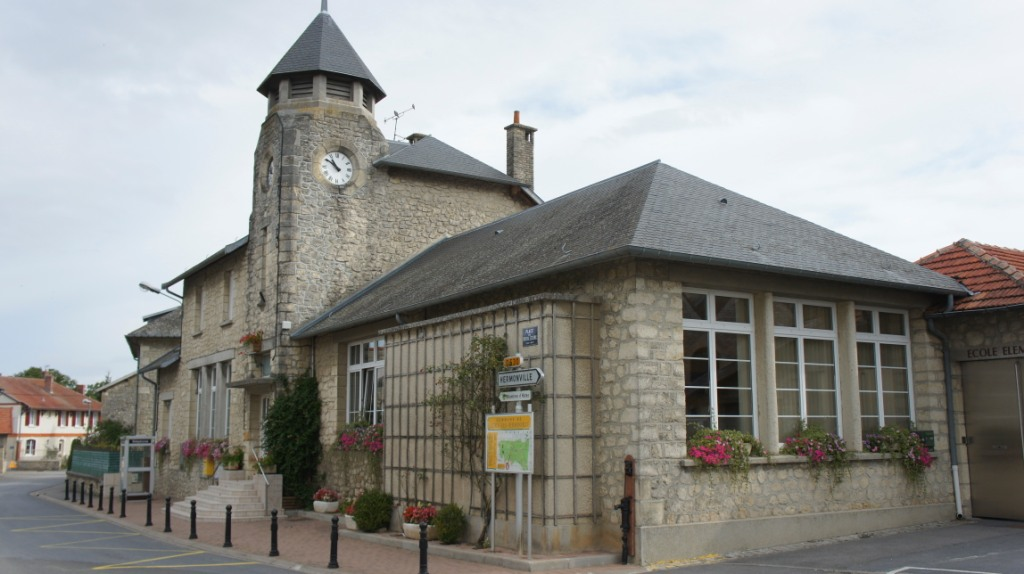
- The town hall in Cauroy-lès-Hermonville

- Coat of arms
- Location of Cauroy-lès-Hermonville
- Location within France Location within Grand Est
- Coordinates: 49°20′58″N 3°55′32″E
- Country: France
- Region: Grand Est
- Department: Marne
- Arrondissement: Reims
- Canton: Bourgogne-Fresne
- Intercommunality: CU Grand Reims

Government
  - Mayor (2020–2026): Guy Lecomte
- Area^{1}: 10.27 km^{2} (3.97 sq mi)
- Elevation: 100 m (330 ft)
- Highest elevation: 218 m (715 ft)
- Lowest elevation: 62 m (203 ft)
- Population (2023): 514
  - Density: 50.0/km^{2} (130/sq mi)
- Time zone: UTC+01:00 (CET)
  - Summer (DST): UTC+02:00 (CEST)
- INSEE/Postal code: 51102 /51220
- ^{1} French Land Register data, which excludes lakes, ponds, glaciers > 1 km^{2} (0.386 sq mi or 247 acres) and river estuaries.

Cauroy-lès-Hermonville (French pronunciation: [koʁwa lɛ ɛʁmɔ̃vil], literally Cauroy near Hermonville) is a commune in the Marne department in north-eastern France.

== See also ==
- Communes of the Marne department
