= Canton of Bourgogne-Fresne =

Coordinates: 49.35°N 4.07°E

The canton of Bourgogne-Fresne (before 2021: Bourgogne) is an administrative division of the Marne department, northeastern France. Its borders were modified at the French canton reorganisation which came into effect in March 2015. Its seat is in Bourgogne-Fresne.

It consists of the following communes:

1. Auménancourt
2. Bazancourt
3. Beine-Nauroy
4. Berméricourt
5. Berru
6. Boult-sur-Suippe
7. Bourgogne-Fresne
8. Brimont
9. Caurel
10. Cauroy-lès-Hermonville
11. Cormicy
12. Courcy
13. Hermonville
14. Heutrégiville
15. Isles-sur-Suippe
16. Lavannes
17. Loivre
18. Merfy
19. Nogent-l'Abbesse
20. Pomacle
21. Pouillon
22. Saint-Étienne-sur-Suippe
23. Saint-Thierry
24. Thil
25. Villers-Franqueux
26. Warmeriville
27. Witry-lès-Reims
