= Bazancourt, Marne =

Bazancourt
- Commune
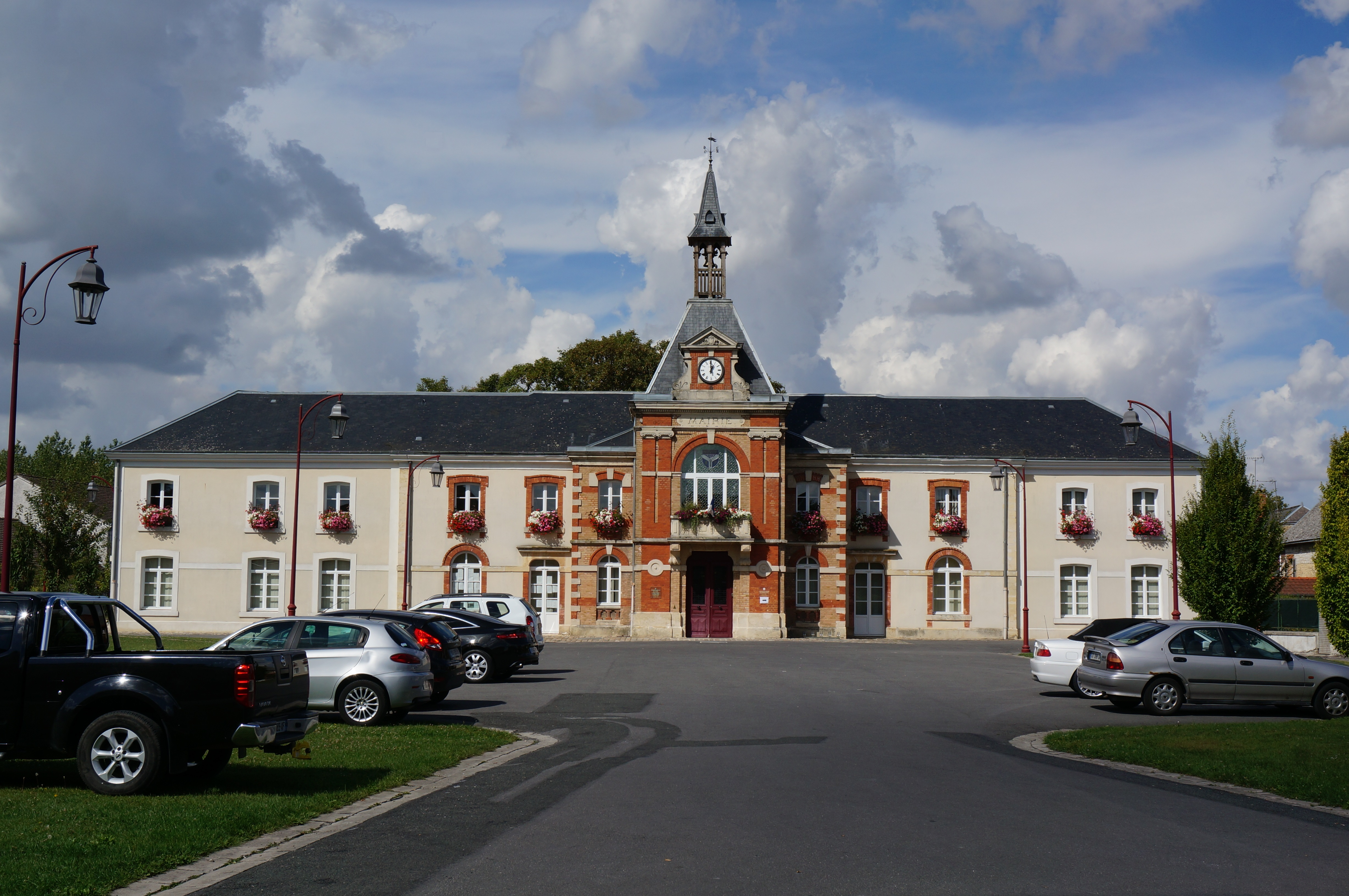
- The town hall in Bazancourt

- Coat of arms
- Location of Bazancourt
- Location within France Location within Grand Est
- Coordinates: 49°21′51″N 4°10′16″E
- Country: France
- Region: Grand Est
- Department: Marne
- Arrondissement: Reims
- Canton: Bourgogne-Fresne
- Intercommunality: CU Grand Reims

Government
  - Mayor (2023–2026): Dominique Leclère
- Area^{1}: 11.64 km^{2} (4.49 sq mi)
- Elevation: 77 m (253 ft)
- Population (2023): 2,495
  - Density: 214.3/km^{2} (555.2/sq mi)
- Time zone: UTC+01:00 (CET)
  - Summer (DST): UTC+02:00 (CEST)
- INSEE/Postal code: 51043 /51110
- ^{1} French Land Register data, which excludes lakes, ponds, glaciers > 1 km^{2} (0.386 sq mi or 247 acres) and river estuaries.

Bazancourt (French pronunciation: [bazɑ̃kuʁ]) is a commune in the Marne department in northeastern France.

== Geography ==
The Suippe flows northwest through the middle of the commune and crosses the village.

== Population ==
Historical population
Year	Pop.	±% p.a.
1968	1,748	—
1975	1,791	+0.35%
1982	1,816	+0.20%
1990	1,877	+0.41%
1999	1,940	+0.37%
2007	1,963	+0.15%
2012	1,985	+0.22%
2017	2,212	+2.19%
2023	2,495	+2.03%
Source: INSEE

== See also ==
- Communes of the Marne department
