= Merfy =

- Commune
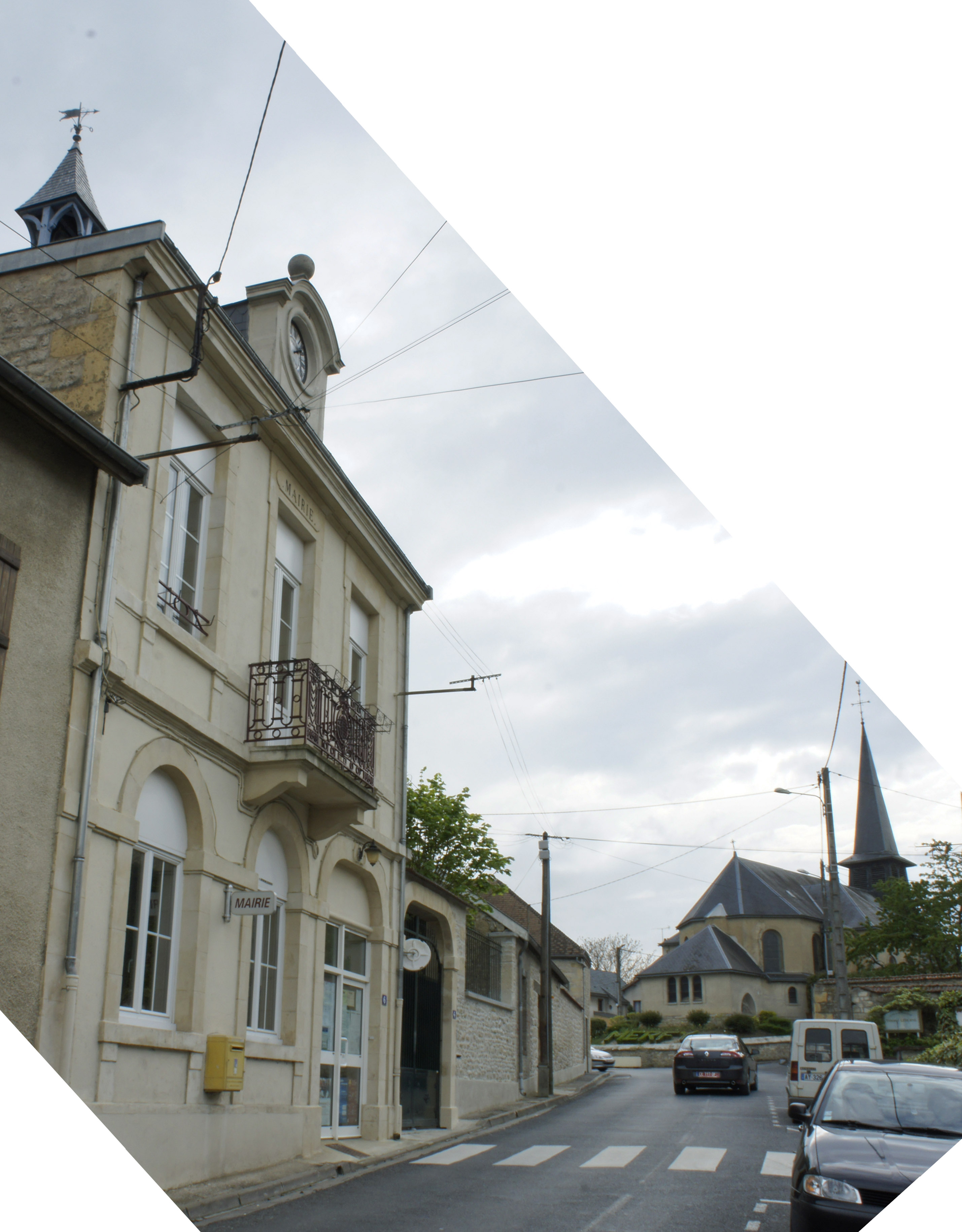
- The town Hall and the Sainte-Marie-Madeleine church

- Coat of arms
- Location of Merfy
- Location within France Location within Grand Est
- Coordinates: 49°17′49″N 3°56′56″E
- Country: France
- Region: Grand Est
- Department: Marne
- Arrondissement: Reims
- Canton: Bourgogne-Fresne
- Intercommunality: CU Grand Reims

Government
  - Mayor (2020–2026): Marie Roze
- Area^{1}: 6.69 km^{2} (2.58 sq mi)
- Elevation: 142 m (466 ft)
- Population (2023): 609
  - Density: 91.0/km^{2} (236/sq mi)
- Time zone: UTC+01:00 (CET)
  - Summer (DST): UTC+02:00 (CEST)
- INSEE/Postal code: 51362 /51220
- ^{1} French Land Register data, which excludes lakes, ponds, glaciers > 1 km^{2} (0.386 sq mi or 247 acres) and river estuaries.

Merfy (French pronunciation: [mɛʁfi]) is a commune in the Marne department in north-eastern France.

== Population ==
Historical population
Year	Pop.	±% p.a.
1968	389	—
1975	393	+0.15%
1982	496	+3.38%
1990	547	+1.23%
1999	651	+1.95%
2007	654	+0.06%
2012	622	−1.00%
2017	605	−0.55%
2023	609	+0.11%
Source: INSEE

== See also ==
- Communes of the Marne department
