= Heutrégiville =

- Commune
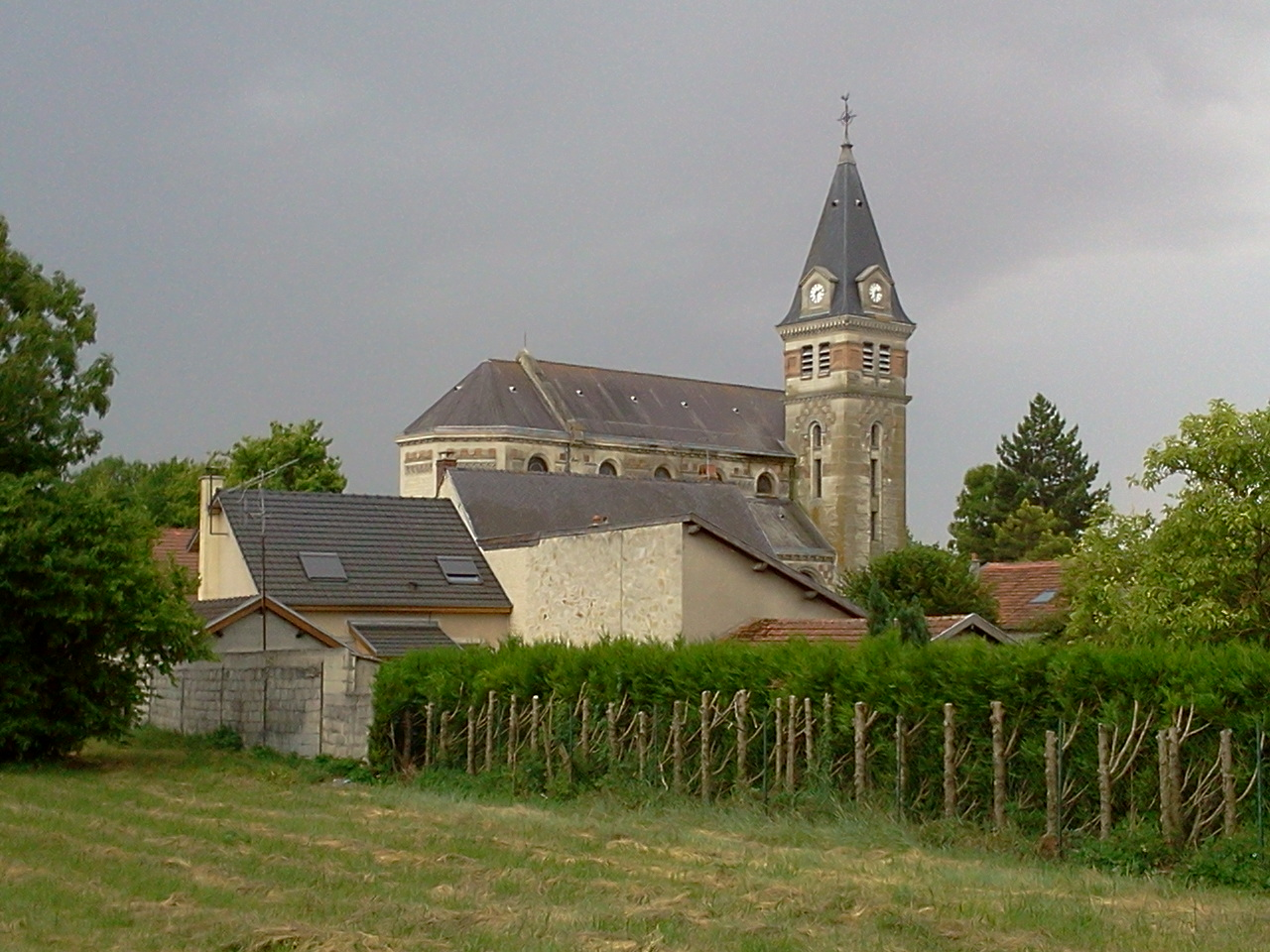
- The church in Heutrégiville
- Location of Heutrégiville
- Location within France Location within Grand Est
- Coordinates: 49°19′33″N 4°15′46″E
- Country: France
- Region: Grand Est
- Department: Marne
- Arrondissement: Reims
- Canton: Bourgogne-Fresne
- Intercommunality: CU Grand Reims

Government
  - Mayor (2020–2026): Maryline Bailly
- Area^{1}: 11.80 km^{2} (4.56 sq mi)
- Elevation: 94 m (308 ft)
- Population (2023): 508
  - Density: 43.1/km^{2} (112/sq mi)
- Demonym: Huldériquois
- Time zone: UTC+01:00 (CET)
  - Summer (DST): UTC+02:00 (CEST)
- INSEE/Postal code: 51293 /51110
- ^{1} French Land Register data, which excludes lakes, ponds, glaciers > 1 km^{2} (0.386 sq mi or 247 acres) and river estuaries.

Heutrégiville (French pronunciation: [øtʁeʒivil]) is a commune in the Marne department (region of Grand Est), in the arrondissement of Reims and in the canton of Bourgogne-Fresne in north-eastern France.

== Geography ==
The village lies on the right bank of the Suippe, which flows northwestward through the commune.

== See also ==
- Communes of the Marne department
