= Thil, Marne =

Thil
- Commune
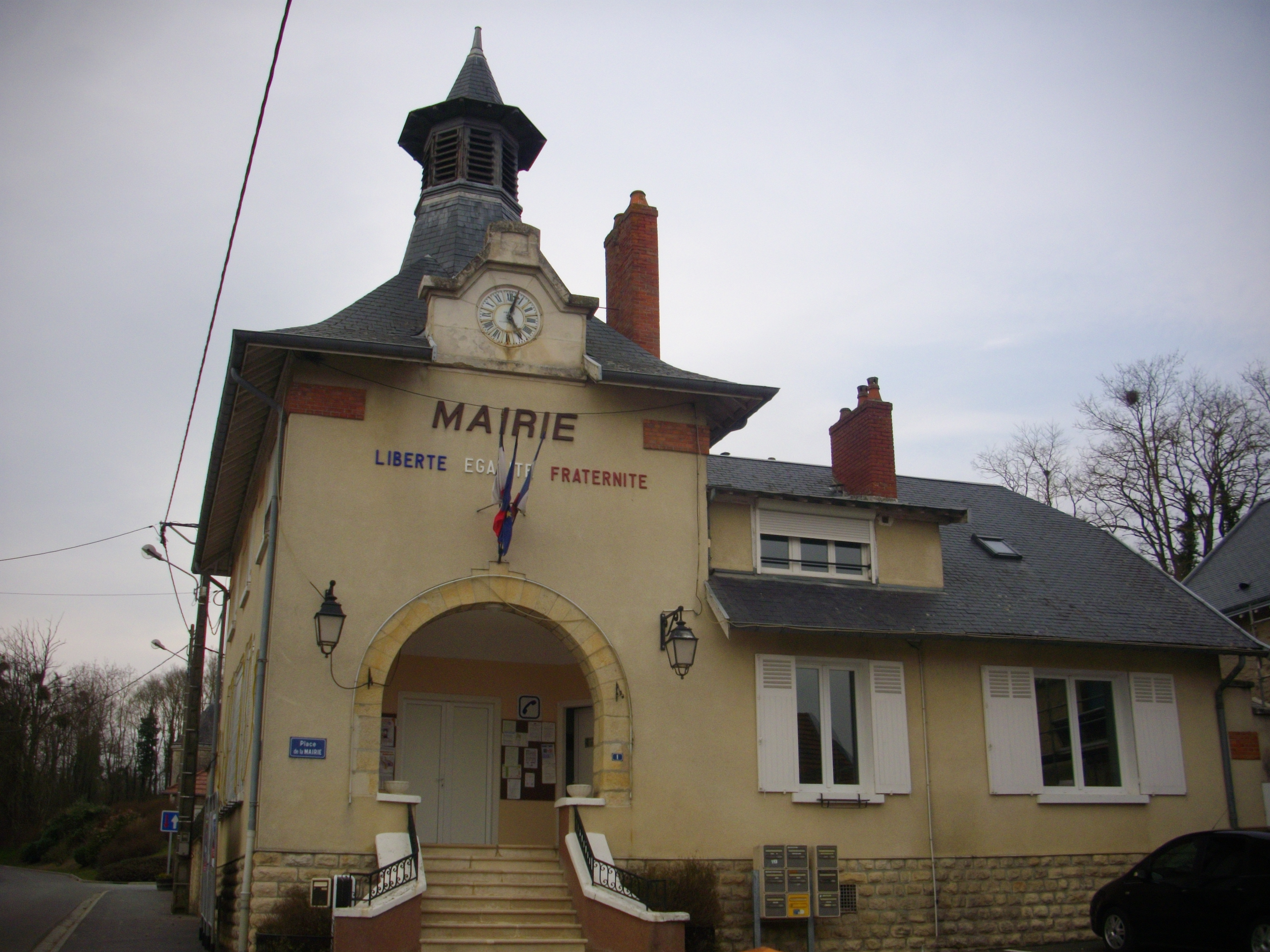
- The town hall in Thil
- Location of Thil
- Location within France Location within Grand Est
- Coordinates: 49°18′57″N 3°57′48″E
- Country: France
- Region: Grand Est
- Department: Marne
- Arrondissement: Reims
- Canton: Bourgogne-Fresne
- Intercommunality: CU Grand Reims

Government
  - Mayor (2020–2026): Jeanne Jacquet
- Area^{1}: 2.11 km^{2} (0.81 sq mi)
- Elevation: 107 m (351 ft)
- Population (2023): 327
  - Density: 155/km^{2} (401/sq mi)
- Time zone: UTC+01:00 (CET)
  - Summer (DST): UTC+02:00 (CEST)
- INSEE/Postal code: 51568 /51220
- ^{1} French Land Register data, which excludes lakes, ponds, glaciers > 1 km^{2} (0.386 sq mi or 247 acres) and river estuaries.

Thil (French pronunciation: [til]) is a commune in the Marne department in north-eastern France.

== See also ==
- Communes of the Marne department
