= Caurel, Marne =

Caurel
- Commune
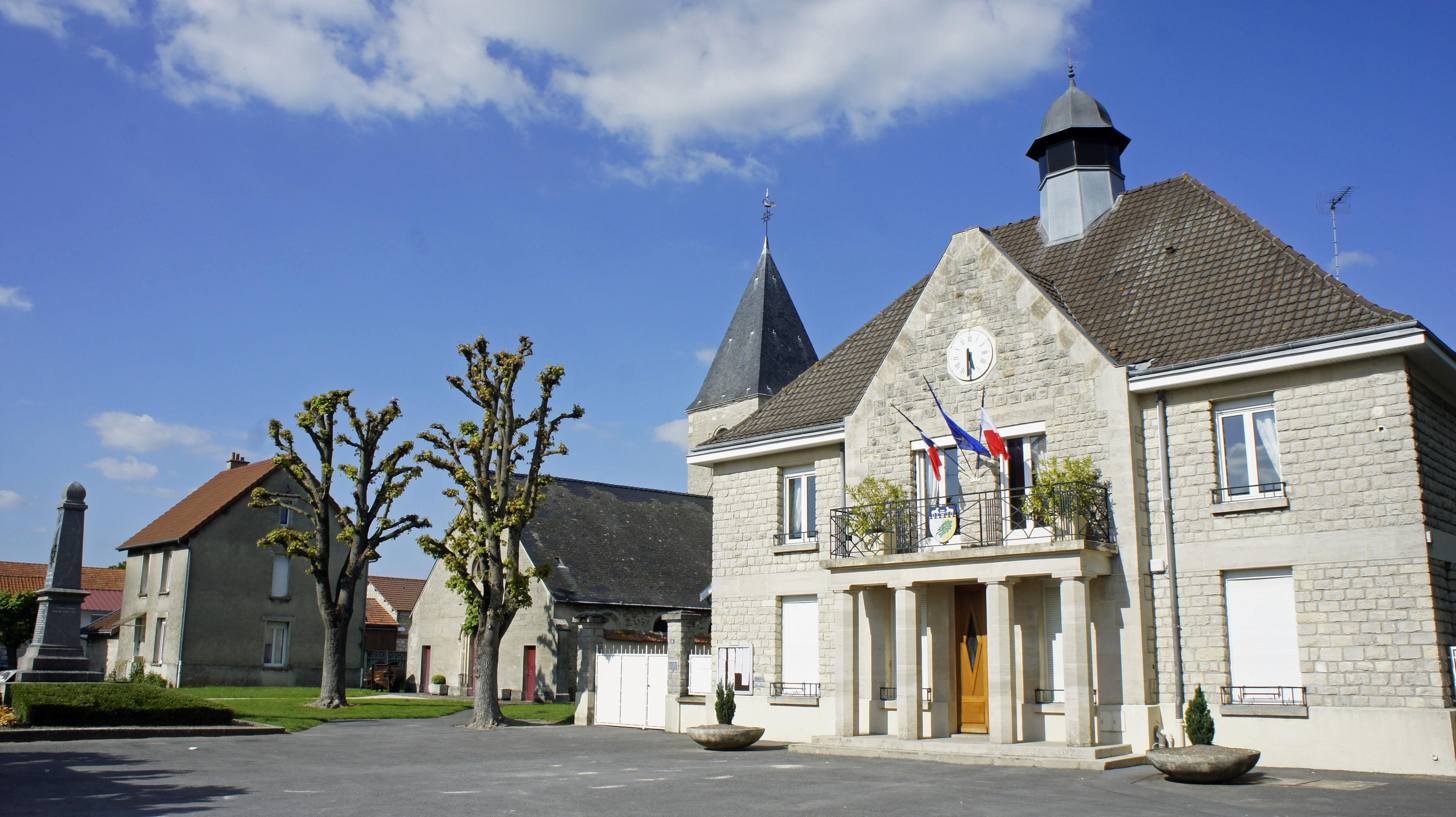
- The town hall in Caurel

- Coat of arms
- Location of Caurel
- Location within France Location within Grand Est
- Coordinates: 49°18′18″N 4°09′13″E
- Country: France
- Region: Grand Est
- Department: Marne
- Arrondissement: Reims
- Canton: Bourgogne-Fresne
- Intercommunality: CU Grand Reims

Government
  - Mayor (2020–2026): Denis Lhotelain
- Area^{1}: 9.79 km^{2} (3.78 sq mi)
- Elevation: 117 m (384 ft)
- Population (2023): 693
  - Density: 70.8/km^{2} (183/sq mi)
- Time zone: UTC+01:00 (CET)
  - Summer (DST): UTC+02:00 (CEST)
- INSEE/Postal code: 51101 /51110
- ^{1} French Land Register data, which excludes lakes, ponds, glaciers > 1 km^{2} (0.386 sq mi or 247 acres) and river estuaries.

Caurel (French pronunciation: [koʁɛl]) is a commune in the Marne department in north-eastern France.

== See also ==
- Communes of the Marne department
