= Nogent-l'Abbesse =

- Commune
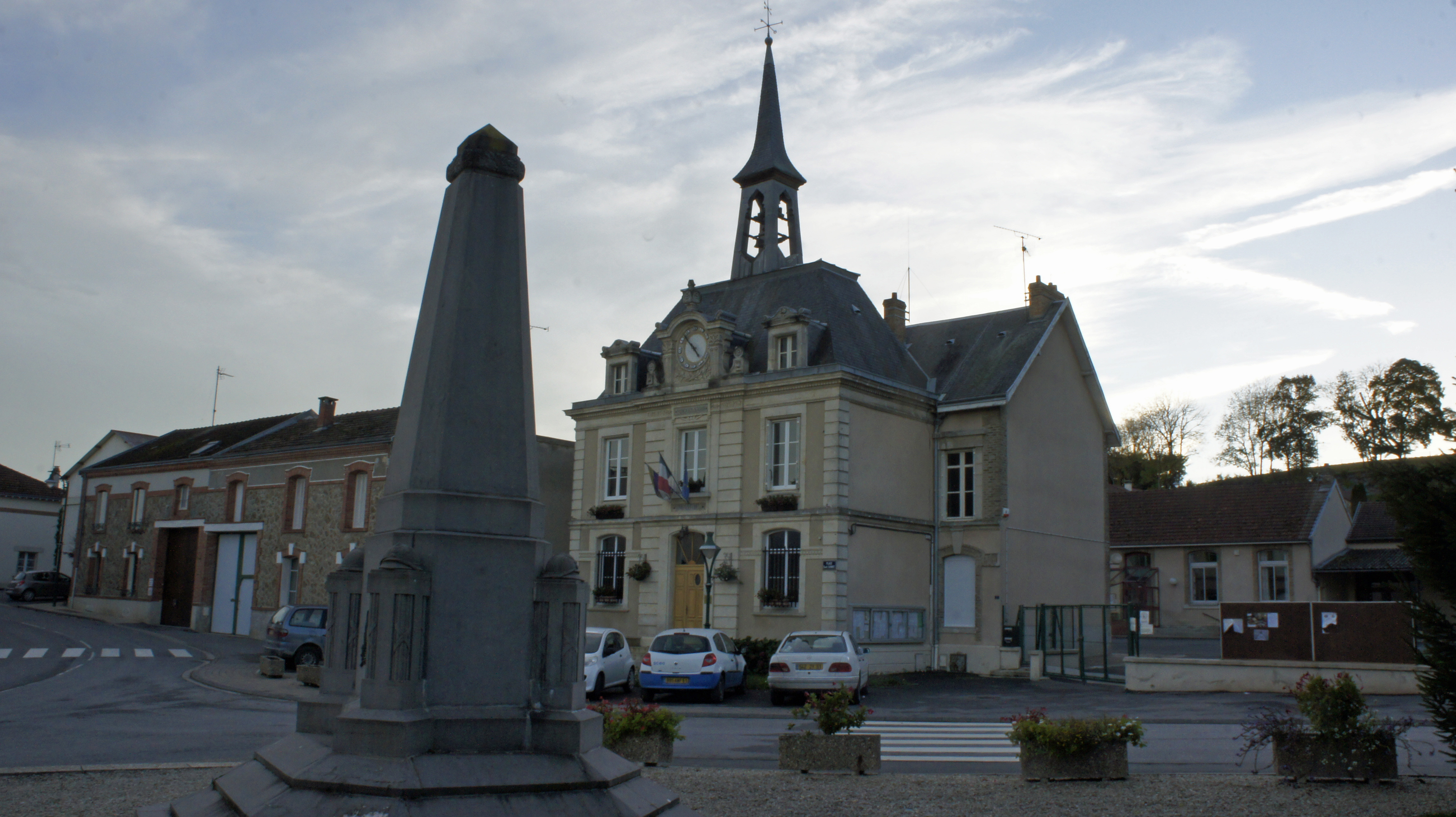
- The town hall in Nogent-l'Abbesse

- Coat of arms
- Location of Nogent-l'Abbesse
- Location within France Location within Grand Est
- Coordinates: 49°15′15″N 4°09′28″E
- Country: France
- Region: Grand Est
- Department: Marne
- Arrondissement: Reims
- Canton: Bourgogne-Fresne
- Intercommunality: CU Grand Reims

Government
  - Mayor (2022–2026): Didier Henriet
- Area^{1}: 10.16 km^{2} (3.92 sq mi)
- Elevation: 185 m (607 ft)
- Population (2023): 542
  - Density: 53.3/km^{2} (138/sq mi)
- Time zone: UTC+01:00 (CET)
  - Summer (DST): UTC+02:00 (CEST)
- INSEE/Postal code: 51403 /51420
- ^{1} French Land Register data, which excludes lakes, ponds, glaciers > 1 km^{2} (0.386 sq mi or 247 acres) and river estuaries.

Nogent-l'Abbesse (French pronunciation: [nɔʒɑ̃ labɛs]) is a commune in the Marne department in north-eastern France.

== See also ==
- Communes of the Marne department
