= Pomacle =

- Commune
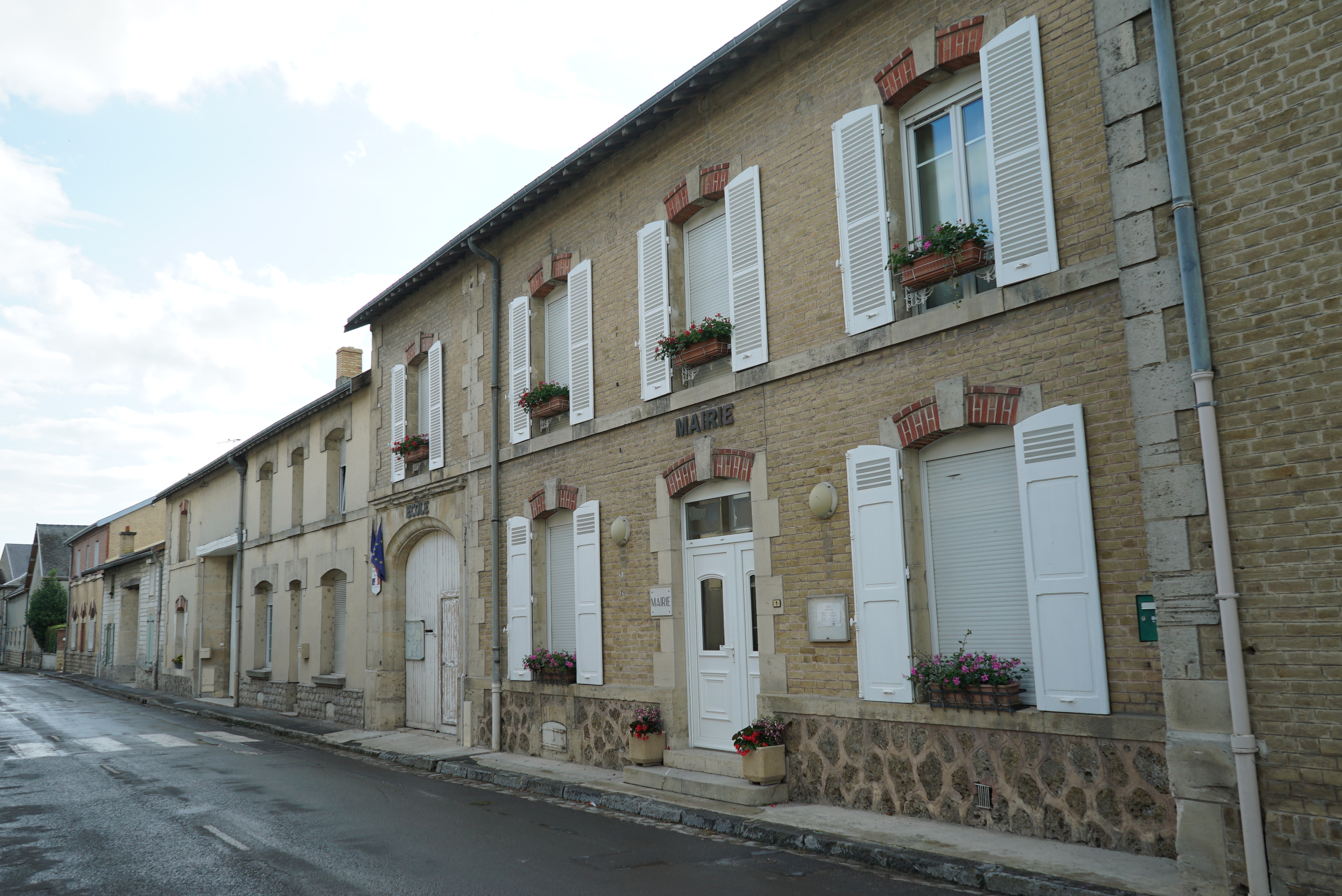
- The town hall in Pomacle
- Location of Pomacle
- Location within France Location within Grand Est
- Coordinates: 49°20′09″N 4°08′53″E
- Country: France
- Region: Grand Est
- Department: Marne
- Arrondissement: Reims
- Canton: Bourgogne-Fresne
- Intercommunality: CU Grand Reims

Government
  - Mayor (2020–2026): Anne Desveronniers
- Area^{1}: 11.19 km^{2} (4.32 sq mi)
- Elevation: 96 m (315 ft)
- Population (2023): 540
  - Density: 48/km^{2} (120/sq mi)
- Time zone: UTC+01:00 (CET)
  - Summer (DST): UTC+02:00 (CEST)
- INSEE/Postal code: 51439 /51110
- ^{1} French Land Register data, which excludes lakes, ponds, glaciers > 1 km^{2} (0.386 sq mi or 247 acres) and river estuaries.

Pomacle (French pronunciation: [pɔmakl]) is a commune in the department of Marne, in the Grand Est region, northeastern France. As of 2023, the village has 540 inhabitants.

== Etymology ==
The origin of the name Pomacle is uncertain. A theory connects the Latin word pomum, meaning fruit, with a suffix such as pometum, meaning an orchard or fruit trees. Another hypothesis is that the name of Pomacle comes from the name of a brook, a tributary of the Suippe, which flows through the Bazancourt area.

== History ==
The name 'Pomacle' is recorded for the first time in 1145 in administrative archives from the village of Reims (Pomaclum). This took effect by a papal bull issued by Pope Eugene III. This confirmed immunity for the abbey of Saint Remi of Reims and for its dependencies.

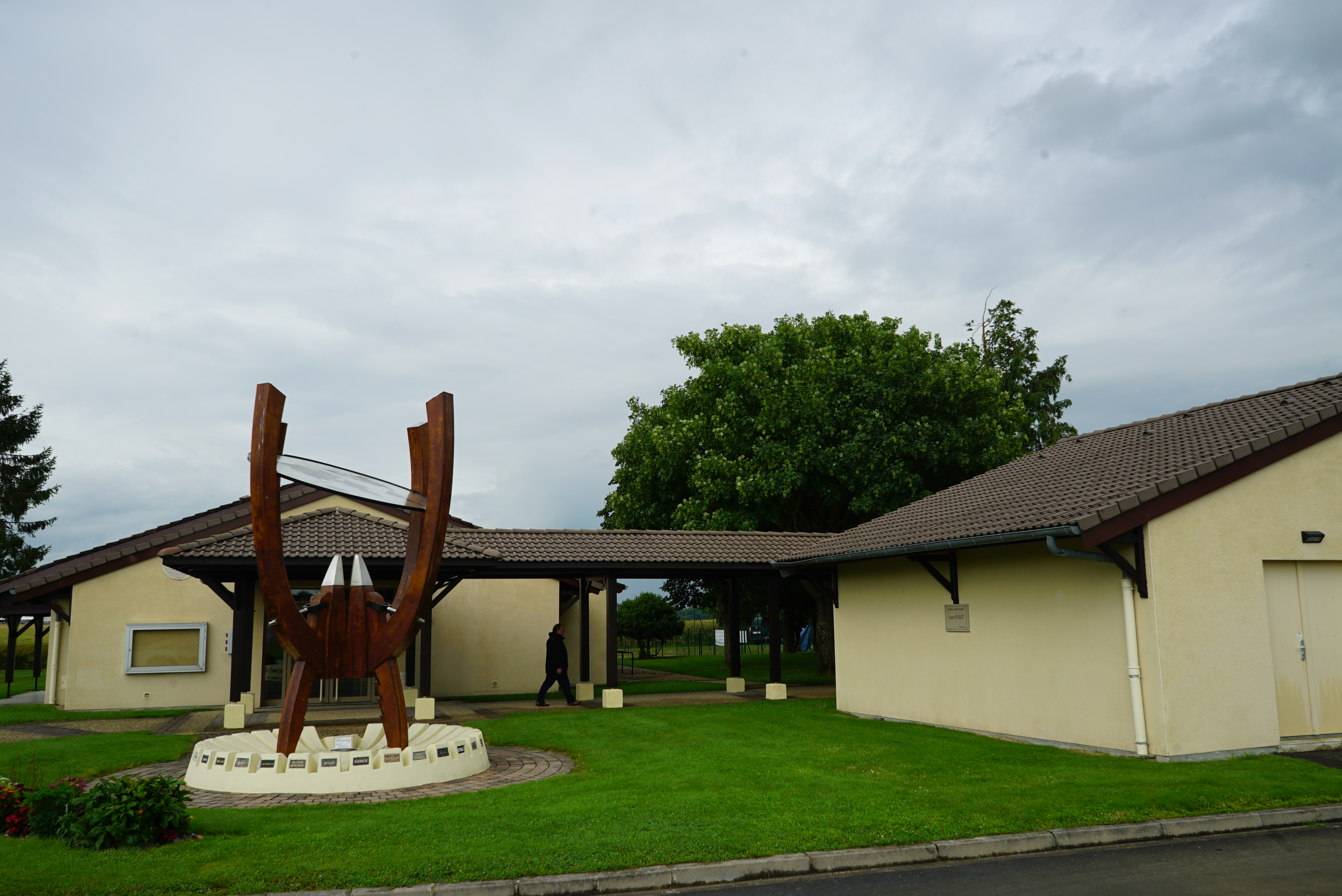

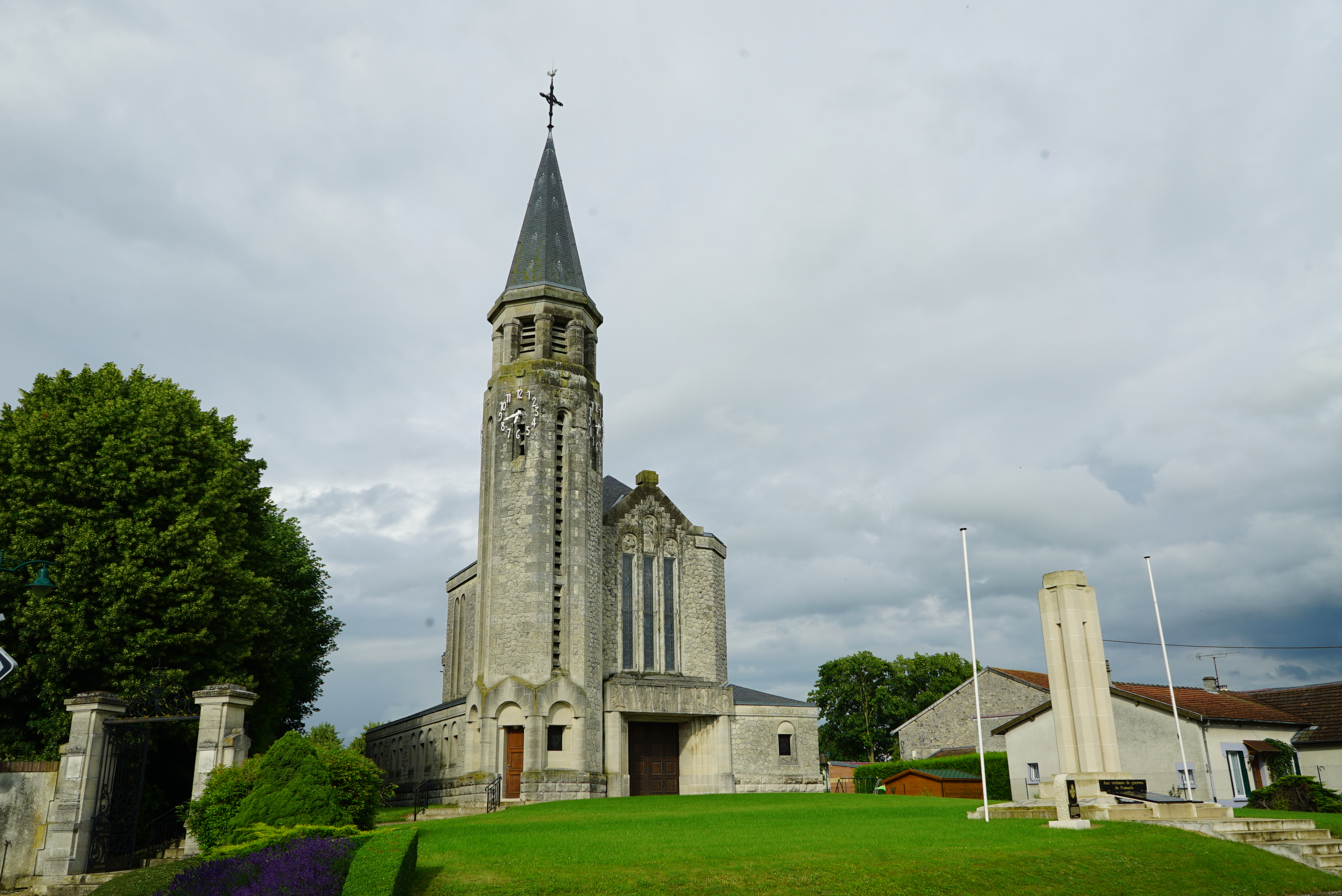
A church and war memorial

Pomacle suffered damage in 1650 and during the First World War. On 2 September 1914, as French forces retreated during the early parts of the conflict, the inhabitants of the village were forced to flee. However, after the Germans overtook the fleeing villagers and they were forced to return to Pomacle. A victorious Entente counter-offensive forced the German army to retreat. After the front was stabilized, Pomacle remained under occupation for four years and was located close to the frontline. During 1917, the pressure of the French army increased, and the villagers were evacuated by order of the Germans on 19 March 1917.

At the end of the war, when the inhabitants of Pomacle returned, the church had been destroyed and four fifths of the houses were seriously damaged. At first, the villagers lived in ruined houses. Then, at the request of disaster victims, the Ministry of Liberated Regions provided some prefabricated huts for temporary housing. For many, this temporary housing lasted at least 4 years.

== Economy ==
The principal economic activity of Pomacle is farming. In 1933, it had 36 farms. In 1963, this number declined to no more than 26, and at the end of the year 2000 counted 10 agricultural operations. There were also 6 non-agricultural, local businesses. The main crops grown are wheat, alfalfa, barley and beets, along with some other crops such as asparagus, orchard grass, tobacco and rapeseed. Yields have largely increased during the last 50 years. From 30 quintals per hectare for wheat in 1949, the yields today have increased to 90-110 quintals. These increases have also occurred in beet production.

== See also ==
- Communes of the Marne department
