= Villers-Franqueux =

- Commune
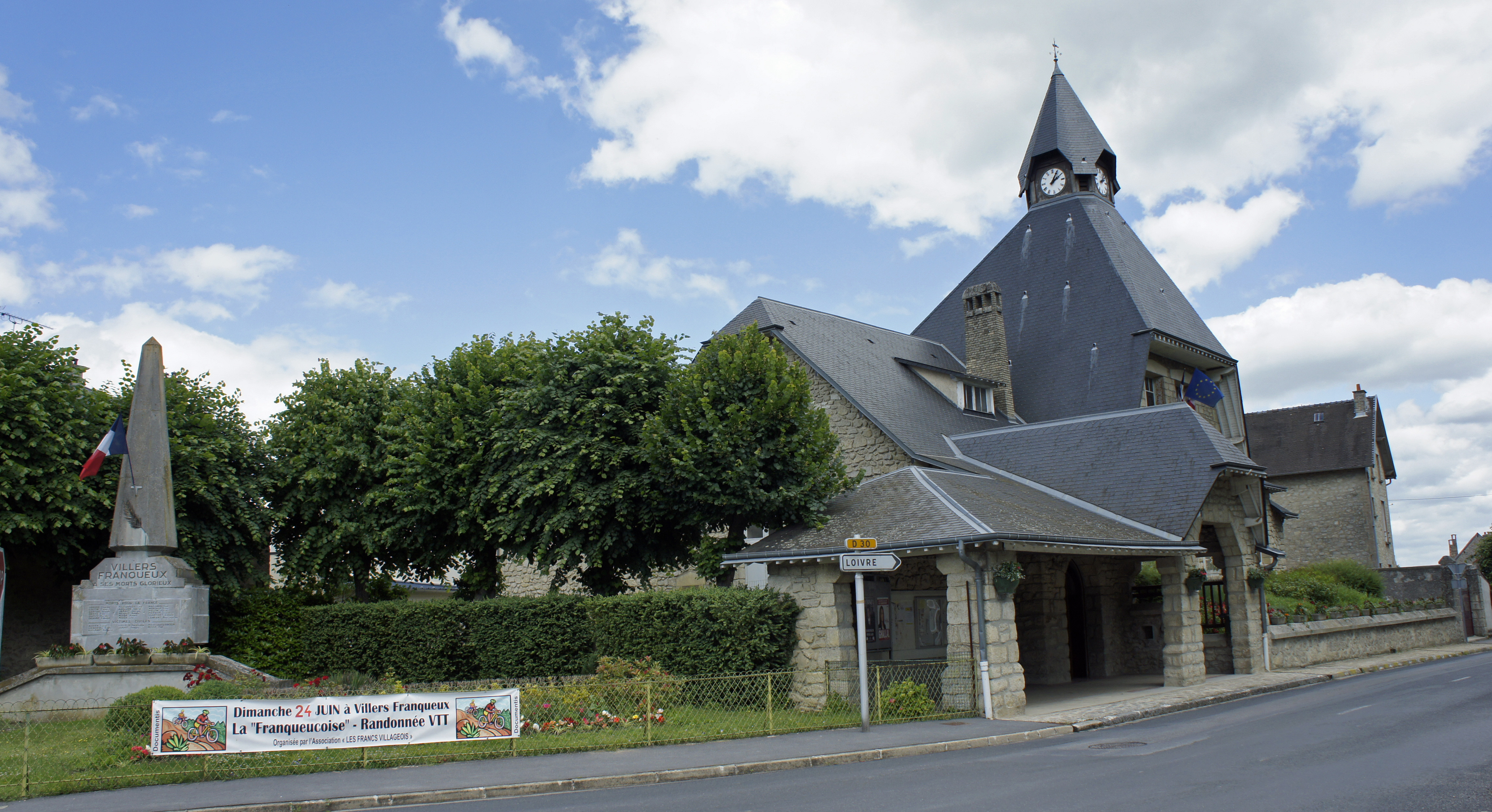
- The town hall in Villers-Franqueux
- Location of Villers-Franqueux
- Location within France Location within Grand Est
- Coordinates: 49°19′43″N 3°56′40″E
- Country: France
- Region: Grand Est
- Department: Marne
- Arrondissement: Reims
- Canton: Bourgogne-Fresne
- Intercommunality: CU Grand Reims

Government
  - Mayor (2020–2026): Eric Maltot
- Area^{1}: 3.29 km^{2} (1.27 sq mi)
- Elevation: 145 m (476 ft)
- Population (2023): 298
  - Density: 90.6/km^{2} (235/sq mi)
- Time zone: UTC+01:00 (CET)
  - Summer (DST): UTC+02:00 (CEST)
- INSEE/Postal code: 51633 /51220
- ^{1} French Land Register data, which excludes lakes, ponds, glaciers > 1 km^{2} (0.386 sq mi or 247 acres) and river estuaries.

Villers-Franqueux (French pronunciation: [vilɛʁ fʁɑ̃kø]) is a commune in the Marne department in north-eastern France.

== See also ==
- Communes of the Marne department
