= Pouillon, Marne =

Pouillon
- Commune
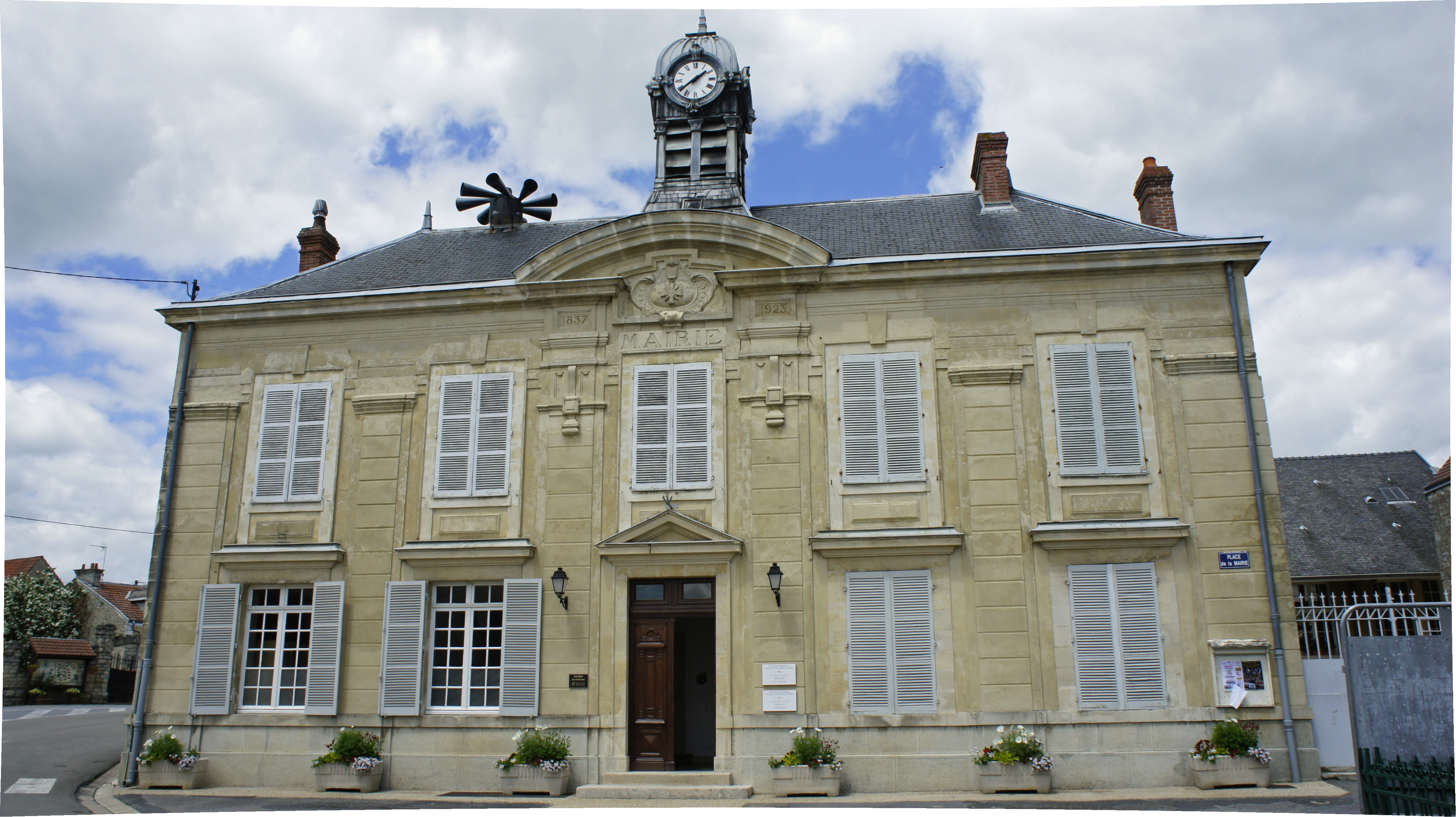
- The town hall in Pouillon
- Location of Pouillon
- Location within France Location within Grand Est
- Coordinates: 49°18′54″N 3°56′55″E
- Country: France
- Region: Grand Est
- Department: Marne
- Arrondissement: Reims
- Canton: Bourgogne-Fresne
- Intercommunality: CU Grand Reims

Government
  - Mayor (2023–2026): Ghislaine Leclere
- Area^{1}: 2.78 km^{2} (1.07 sq mi)
- Elevation: 150 m (490 ft)
- Population (2023): 529
  - Density: 190/km^{2} (493/sq mi)
- Time zone: UTC+01:00 (CET)
  - Summer (DST): UTC+02:00 (CEST)
- INSEE/Postal code: 51444 /51220
- ^{1} French Land Register data, which excludes lakes, ponds, glaciers > 1 km^{2} (0.386 sq mi or 247 acres) and river estuaries.

Pouillon (French pronunciation: [pujɔ̃]) is a commune in the Marne department in north-eastern France.

== See also ==
- Communes of the Marne department
