= Beine-Nauroy =

- Commune
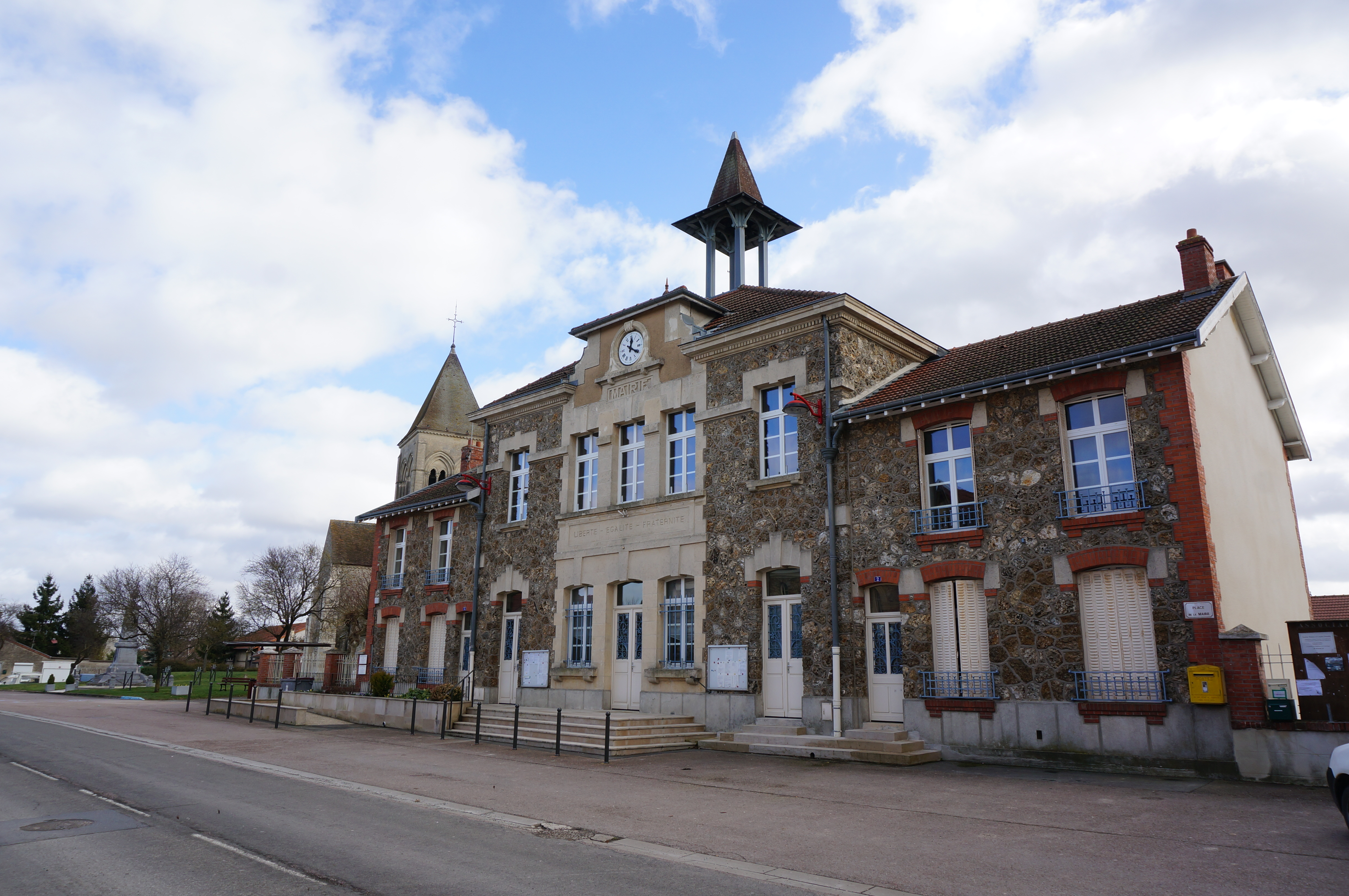
- The town hall in Beine-Nauroy
- Location of Beine-Nauroy
- Location within France Location within Grand Est
- Coordinates: 49°15′03″N 4°13′07″E
- Country: France
- Region: Grand Est
- Department: Marne
- Arrondissement: Reims
- Canton: Bourgogne-Fresne
- Intercommunality: CU Grand Reims

Government
  - Mayor (2020–2026): Romain Bonhomme
- Area^{1}: 42.68 km^{2} (16.48 sq mi)
- Elevation: 80 m (260 ft)
- Population (2023): 1,044
  - Density: 24.46/km^{2} (63.35/sq mi)
- Time zone: UTC+01:00 (CET)
  - Summer (DST): UTC+02:00 (CEST)
- INSEE/Postal code: 51046 /51490
- ^{1} French Land Register data, which excludes lakes, ponds, glaciers > 1 km^{2} (0.386 sq mi or 247 acres) and river estuaries.

Beine-Nauroy (French pronunciation: [bɛn noʁwa]) is a commune in the Marne department in northeastern France.

== Population ==
Historical population
Year	Pop.	±% p.a.
1968	419	—
1975	433	+0.47%
1982	545	+3.34%
1990	718	+3.51%
1999	827	+1.58%
2007	1,034	+2.83%
2012	1,051	+0.33%
2017	1,010	−0.79%
2023	1,044	+0.55%
Source: INSEE

== See also ==
- Communes of the Marne department
