= Hermonville =

- Commune
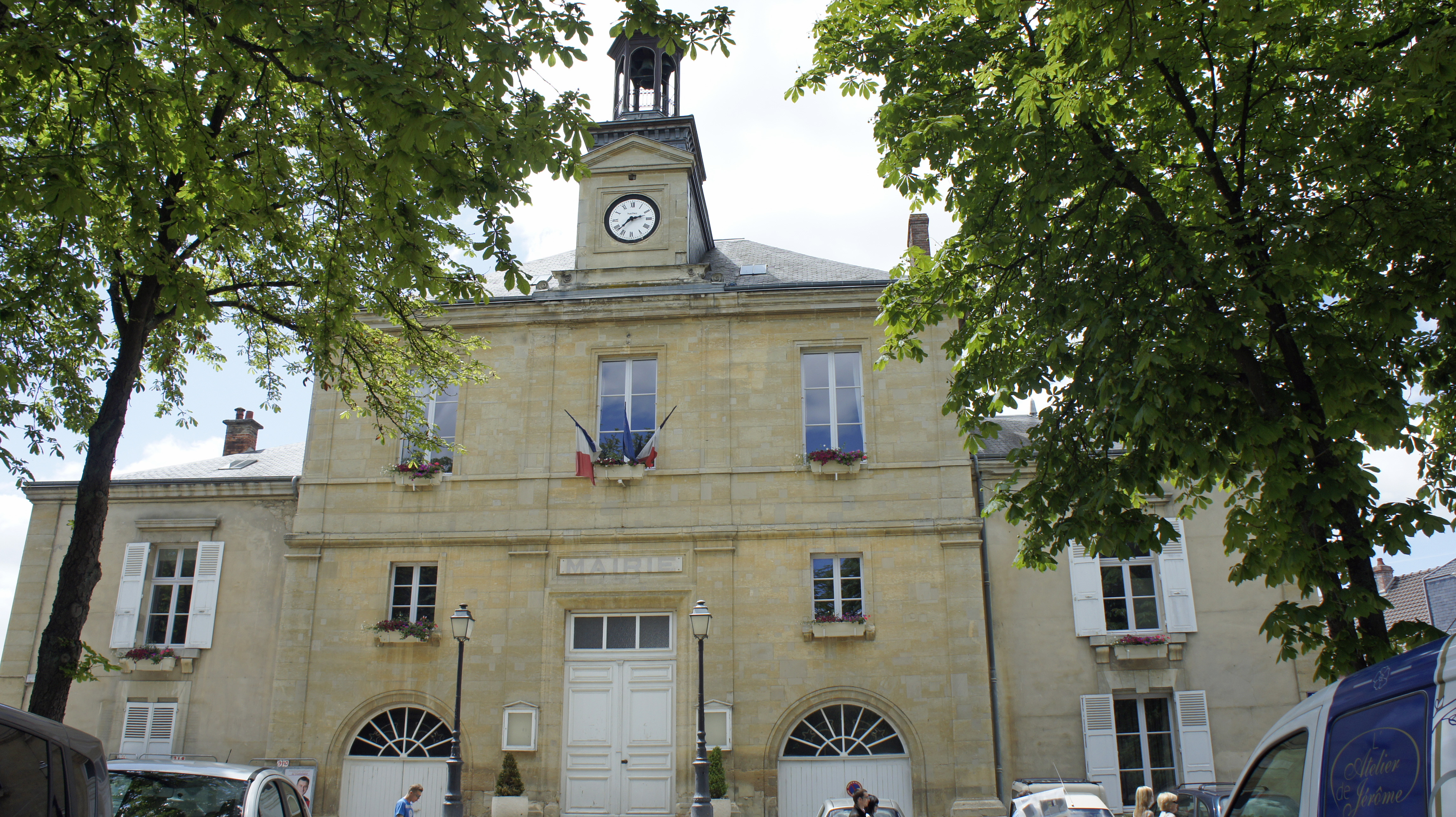
- The town hall in Hermonville

- Coat of arms
- Location of Hermonville
- Location within France Location within Grand Est
- Coordinates: 49°20′10″N 3°54′34″E
- Country: France
- Region: Grand Est
- Department: Marne
- Arrondissement: Reims
- Canton: Bourgogne-Fresne
- Intercommunality: CU Grand Reims

Government
  - Mayor (2020–2026): Katia Beaujard
- Area^{1}: 13.3 km^{2} (5.1 sq mi)
- Elevation: 161 m (528 ft)
- Highest elevation: 217 m (712 ft)
- Lowest elevation: 73 m (240 ft)
- Population (2023): 1,419
  - Density: 107/km^{2} (276/sq mi)
- Demonym: hérémondois
- Time zone: UTC+01:00 (CET)
  - Summer (DST): UTC+02:00 (CEST)
- INSEE/Postal code: 51291 /51220
- ^{1} French Land Register data, which excludes lakes, ponds, glaciers > 1 km^{2} (0.386 sq mi or 247 acres) and river estuaries.

Hermonville (French pronunciation: [ɛʁmɔ̃vil]) is a commune in the Marne department in north-eastern France.

== See also ==
- Communes of the Marne department
