= Berméricourt =

- Commune
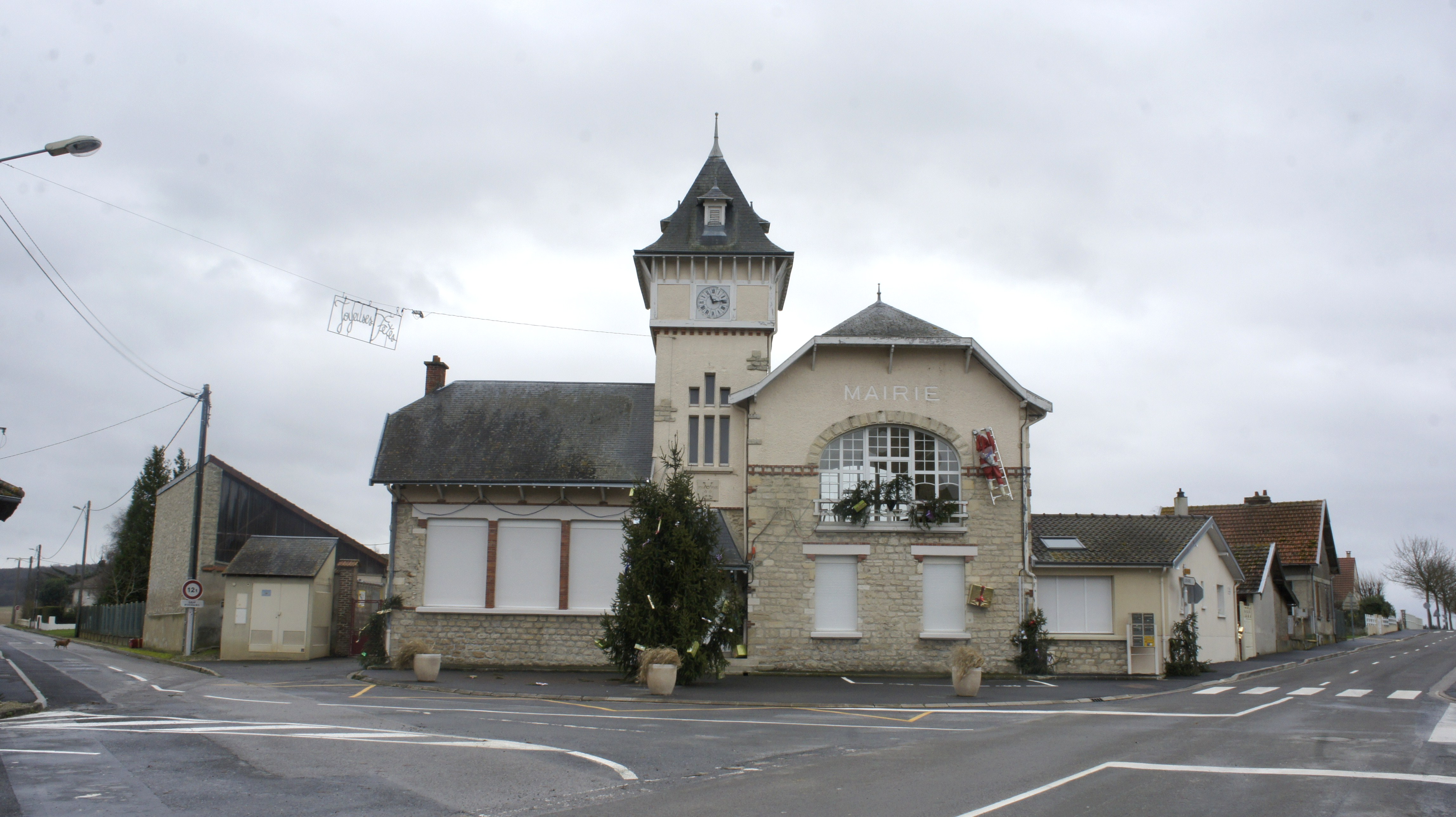
- The town hall in Berméricourt
- Location of Berméricourt
- Location within France Location within Grand Est
- Coordinates: 49°21′31″N 3°59′34″E
- Country: France
- Region: Grand Est
- Department: Marne
- Arrondissement: Reims
- Canton: Bourgogne-Fresne
- Intercommunality: CU Grand Reims

Government
  - Mayor (2020–2026): Patrice Chrétien
- Area^{1}: 8.01 km^{2} (3.09 sq mi)
- Elevation: 85 m (279 ft)
- Highest elevation: 93 m (305 ft)
- Lowest elevation: 69 m (226 ft)
- Population (2023): 266
  - Density: 33.2/km^{2} (86.0/sq mi)
- Time zone: UTC+01:00 (CET)
  - Summer (DST): UTC+02:00 (CEST)
- INSEE/Postal code: 51051 /51220
- ^{1} French Land Register data, which excludes lakes, ponds, glaciers > 1 km^{2} (0.386 sq mi or 247 acres) and river estuaries.

Berméricourt (French pronunciation: [bɛʁmeʁikuʁ]) is a commune in the Marne department in northeastern France.

== Population ==
Historical population
Year	Pop.	±% p.a.
1968	113	—
1975	130	+2.02%
1982	113	−1.98%
1990	115	+0.22%
1999	122	+0.66%
2007	129	+0.70%
2012	169	+5.55%
2017	205	+3.94%
2023	266	+4.44%
Source: INSEE

== See also ==
- Communes of the Marne department
