= Brimont =

- Commune
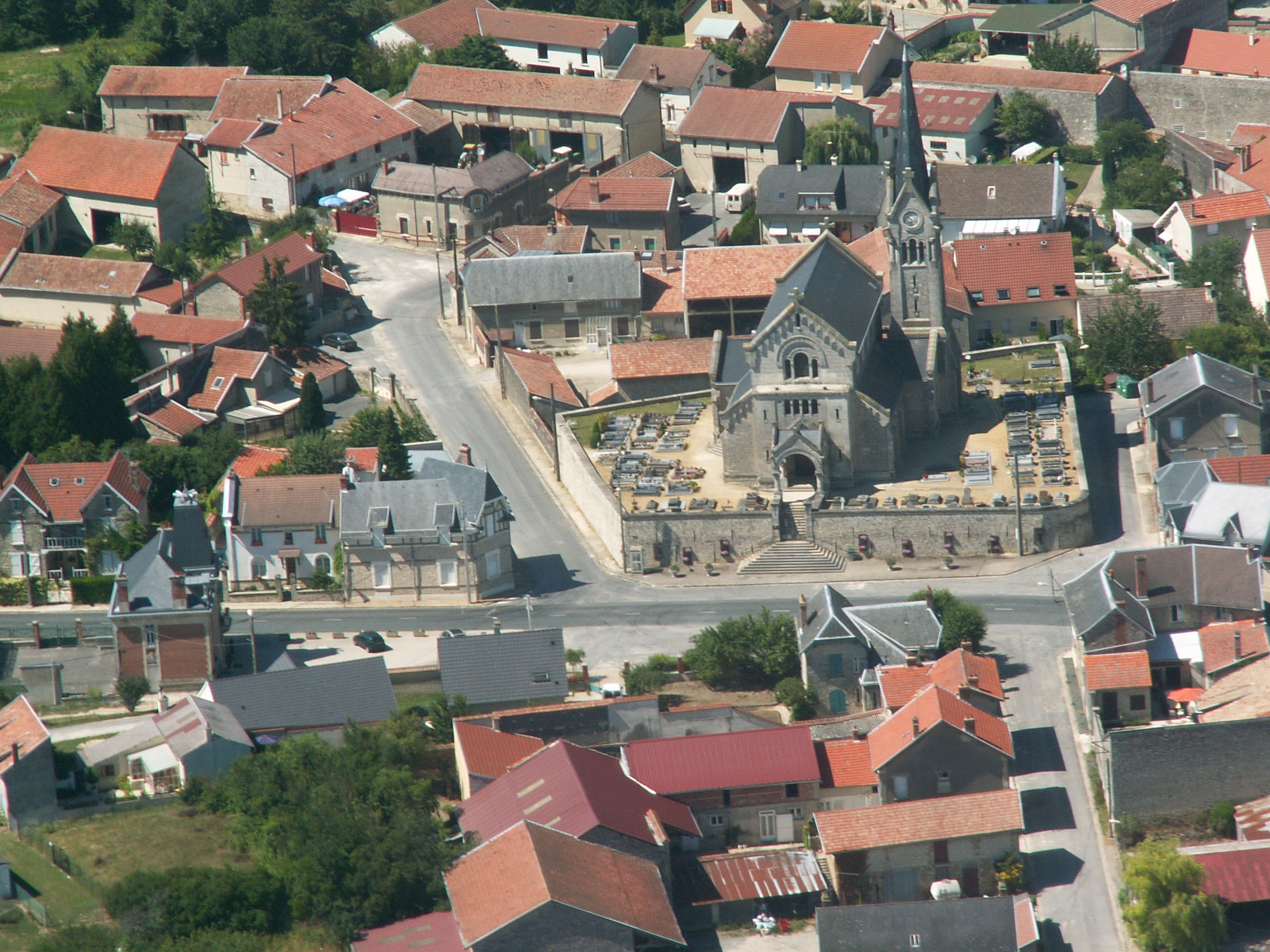
- An aerial view of Brimont

- Coat of arms
- Location of Brimont
- Location within France Location within Grand Est
- Coordinates: 49°20′30″N 4°01′33″E
- Country: France
- Region: Grand Est
- Department: Marne
- Arrondissement: Reims
- Canton: Bourgogne-Fresne
- Intercommunality: CU Grand Reims

Government
  - Mayor (2020–2026): André Jacob
- Area^{1}: 12.61 km^{2} (4.87 sq mi)
- Highest elevation: 170 m (560 ft)
- Lowest elevation: 79 m (259 ft)
- Population (2023): 453
  - Density: 35.9/km^{2} (93.0/sq mi)
- Time zone: UTC+01:00 (CET)
  - Summer (DST): UTC+02:00 (CEST)
- INSEE/Postal code: 51088 /51220
- ^{1} French Land Register data, which excludes lakes, ponds, glaciers > 1 km^{2} (0.386 sq mi or 247 acres) and river estuaries.

Brimont (French pronunciation: [bʁimɔ̃]) is a commune in the Marne department in northeastern France.

== Population ==
Historical population
Year	Pop.	±% p.a.
1968	296	—
1975	335	+1.78%
1982	316	−0.83%
1990	457	+4.72%
1999	456	−0.02%
2007	452	−0.11%
2012	443	−0.40%
2017	432	−0.50%
2023	453	+0.79%
Source: INSEE

== See also ==
- Communes of the Marne department
