= Canton of Vaubecourt =

Former canton in Meuse, France

Coordinates: 48°56′41″N 5°03′54″E

- Former canton
- Location of the canton in the arrondissement of Bar-le-Duc
- Country: France
- Region: Grand Est
- Department: Meuse
- No. of communes: {{{nbcomm}}}
- Disbanded: 2015

Government
  - Representatives: Olivier Poutrieux
- Area: 237.10 km^{2} (91.54 sq mi)
- Population (2012): 2,869
  - Density: 12.10/km^{2} (31.34/sq mi)

The canton of Vaubecourt (French: Canton de Vaubecourt) is a former French canton located in the department of Meuse in the Lorraine region (now part of Grand Est). This canton was organized around Vaubecourt in the arrondissement of Bar-le-Duc. It is now part of the canton of Revigny-sur-Ornain.

The last general councillor from this canton was Olivier Poutrieux (MoDem), elected in 2011.

== Composition ==
The canton of Vaubecourt grouped together 12 municipalities and had 2,869 inhabitants (2012 census without double counts).

1. Chaumont-sur-Aire
2. Courcelles-sur-Aire
3. Érize-la-Petite
4. Les Hauts-de-Chée
5. Laheycourt
6. Lisle-en-Barrois
7. Louppy-le-Château
8. Noyers-Auzécourt
9. Rembercourt-Sommaisne
10. Sommeilles
11. Vaubecourt
12. Villotte-devant-Louppy
