= Heiltz =

Heiltz may refer to three communes in the Marne department in north-eastern France:

- Heiltz-le-Hutier
- Heiltz-le-Maurupt
- Heiltz-l'Évêque
