= Merlaut =

- Commune
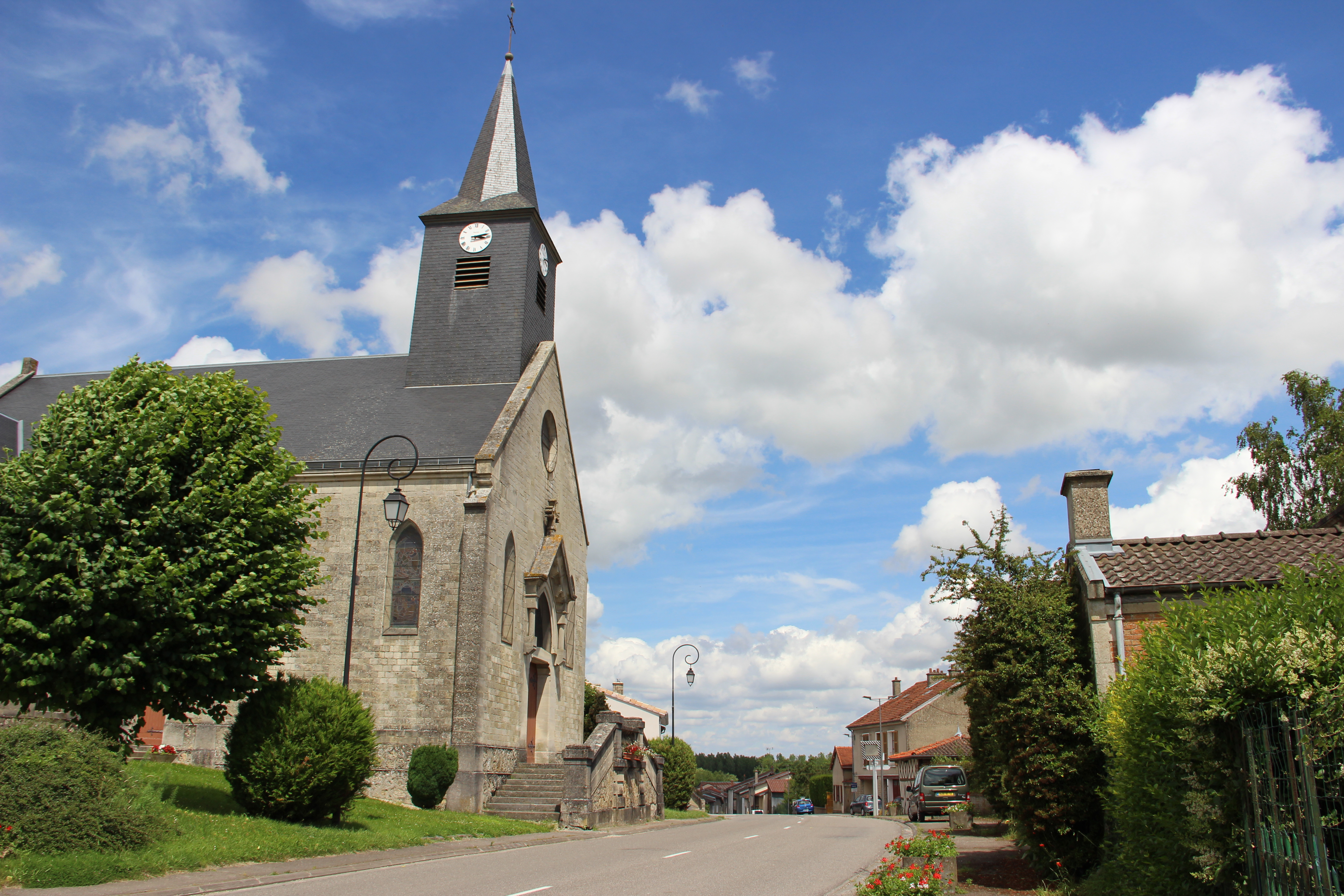
- The church in Merlaut

- Coat of arms
- Location of Merlaut
- Location within France Location within Grand Est
- Coordinates: 48°45′43″N 4°40′04″E
- Country: France
- Region: Grand Est
- Department: Marne
- Arrondissement: Vitry-le-François
- Canton: Sermaize-les-Bains

Government
  - Mayor (2020–2026): Henry Noël Champenois
- Area^{1}: 5.04 km^{2} (1.95 sq mi)
- Elevation: 104 m (341 ft)
- Population (2023): 275
  - Density: 54.6/km^{2} (141/sq mi)
- Time zone: UTC+01:00 (CET)
  - Summer (DST): UTC+02:00 (CEST)
- INSEE/Postal code: 51363 /51300
- ^{1} French Land Register data, which excludes lakes, ponds, glaciers > 1 km^{2} (0.386 sq mi or 247 acres) and river estuaries.

Merlaut (French pronunciation: [mɛʁlo]) is a commune in the Marne department in north-eastern France.

== Geography ==
The Chée forms most of the commune's north-eastern border, flows westward through the commune, then flows (at Vitry-en-Perthois) into the Saulx, which forms most of the commune's southern border.

== See also ==
- Communes of the Marne department
