= Nettancourt =

- Commune
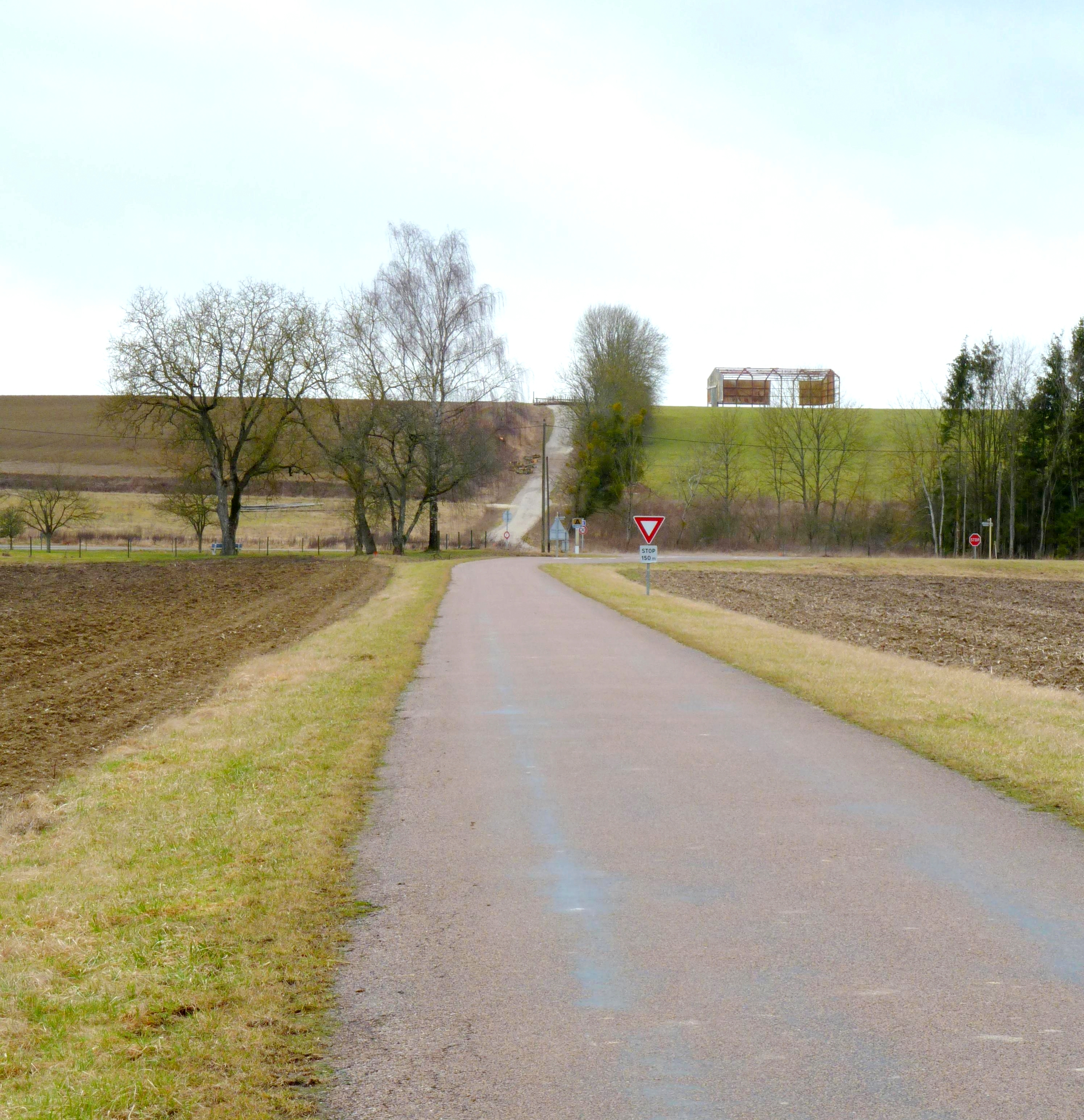
- Roman road

- Coat of arms
- Location of Nettancourt
- Location within France Location within Grand Est
- Coordinates: 48°52′33″N 4°56′37″E
- Country: France
- Region: Grand Est
- Department: Meuse
- Arrondissement: Bar-le-Duc
- Canton: Revigny-sur-Ornain
- Intercommunality: CC du Pays de Revigny-sur-Ornain

Government
  - Mayor (2020–2026): Michel Basset
- Area^{1}: 11.45 km^{2} (4.42 sq mi)
- Elevation: 175 m (574 ft)
- Highest elevation: 187 m (614 ft)
- Lowest elevation: 135 m (443 ft)
- Population (2023): 242
  - Density: 21.1/km^{2} (54.7/sq mi)
- Time zone: UTC+01:00 (CET)
  - Summer (DST): UTC+02:00 (CEST)
- INSEE/Postal code: 55378 /55800
- ^{1} French Land Register data, which excludes lakes, ponds, glaciers > 1 km^{2} (0.386 sq mi or 247 acres) and river estuaries.

Nettancourt (French pronunciation: [nɛtɑ̃kuʁ]) is a commune in the Meuse department in Grand Est in north-eastern France.

== Geography ==
The village lies on the right bank of the Chée, which flows southward through the eastern part of the commune.

- Elevation: 135–187 metres (443–614 ft)
- Residents : Nettancourtois (male), Nettancourtoises (female).
- Land Area : 11.45 square kilometres (4.42 sq mi)
- Nearest commune : Noyers-Auzécourt, Sommeilles
- Nearest big city : Bar-le-Duc.

== Administration ==
Mayors of Nettancourt :

Start	End	Name
1971	1987	Bernard Villanfin
1987	2001	Colette Chevallier
2001	2020	Christophe Antoine
2020	2026	Michel Basset

== Demography ==
Historical population
Year	Pop.	±% p.a.
1968	391	—
1975	361	−1.13%
1982	343	−0.73%
1990	267	−3.08%
1999	284	+0.69%
2007	286	+0.09%
2012	263	−1.66%
2017	252	−0.85%
2023	242	−0.67%
Source: INSEE

== Resources and production ==
- Cereals
- Livestock farming

== Local and daily life ==
- Education: Nettancourt has its own primary school.
- Shops: Bakery, hotel and restaurant, automobile repair shop, ...
- Associations: Go Elan
- Celebrations: local/community holiday : second or third Sunday of July, saint day: June, the 24th.

Like several French cities, Nettancourt has bric-a-brac sales in summer time.

== Toponymy ==
"Nettancourt" appears in 1179. It should be a name of a man + curtius (lat.). The name should be a male German one.
"Nettancourt" is also an aristocratic family name (see Famous people from Nettancourt).

== History ==
- Antiquity :

Nettancourt is close to a famous Roman road (it joins up Reims to Toul cities). Archaeological Gallo-Roman remains (like pieces of pottery and ancient currencies) were found in the area.

- Middle Ages :

Nettancourt is an old fief belonging to Champagne.

- 17th century - 18th century :

A Protestant community lived in the village between 1561 and 1685, protected by the lords of Nettancourt, converted to Calvinism.

- 20th century :

Nettancourt suffers a lot from the First World War (1914–18). One day, to escape to a German offensive, the residents had to leave their village. During this time, German soldiers sat for a moment in several houses.

There are ten names in the war memorial, mobilized at the beginning of the war. They fought bravely to liberate their home.

== Tourist places and monuments ==
Secular architecture :

- Castle of Nettancourt, built again in the 19th century.
- Castle of la Grange-aux-Champs (17th/ 18th, modified in the 19th century).
- Grande-rue : low-relief depicting Saint Hubert's legend (in the lintel of the door).
- Farm, 5-7 rue de l'Orme (group of fronts and roofs).

Sacred architecture :

- Saint-Remi Church: 15th century, restored at the 16th century and in 1708 : naves, apses, gate (1650), vault (1856).
- Saint-Jean-Baptiste chapel : ancient Protestant church, built in 1561, it became catholic after the revocation of the Edict of Nantes. It was built again in 1884.

Place of interest :

- Shore of the Chée
- Area of the church
- Pond of the mill in Sommeilles
- Hood

== Notable people ==
- François Joseph Henri de Nettancourt-Vaubécourt d’Haussonville, bishop of Montauban
- Louis-Claude de Nettancourt-Haussonville

== See also ==
- Communes of the Meuse department (en)
- Roman roads (en)
- Voie romaine Reims-Metz (French)
