= Beurey-sur-Saulx =

- Commune
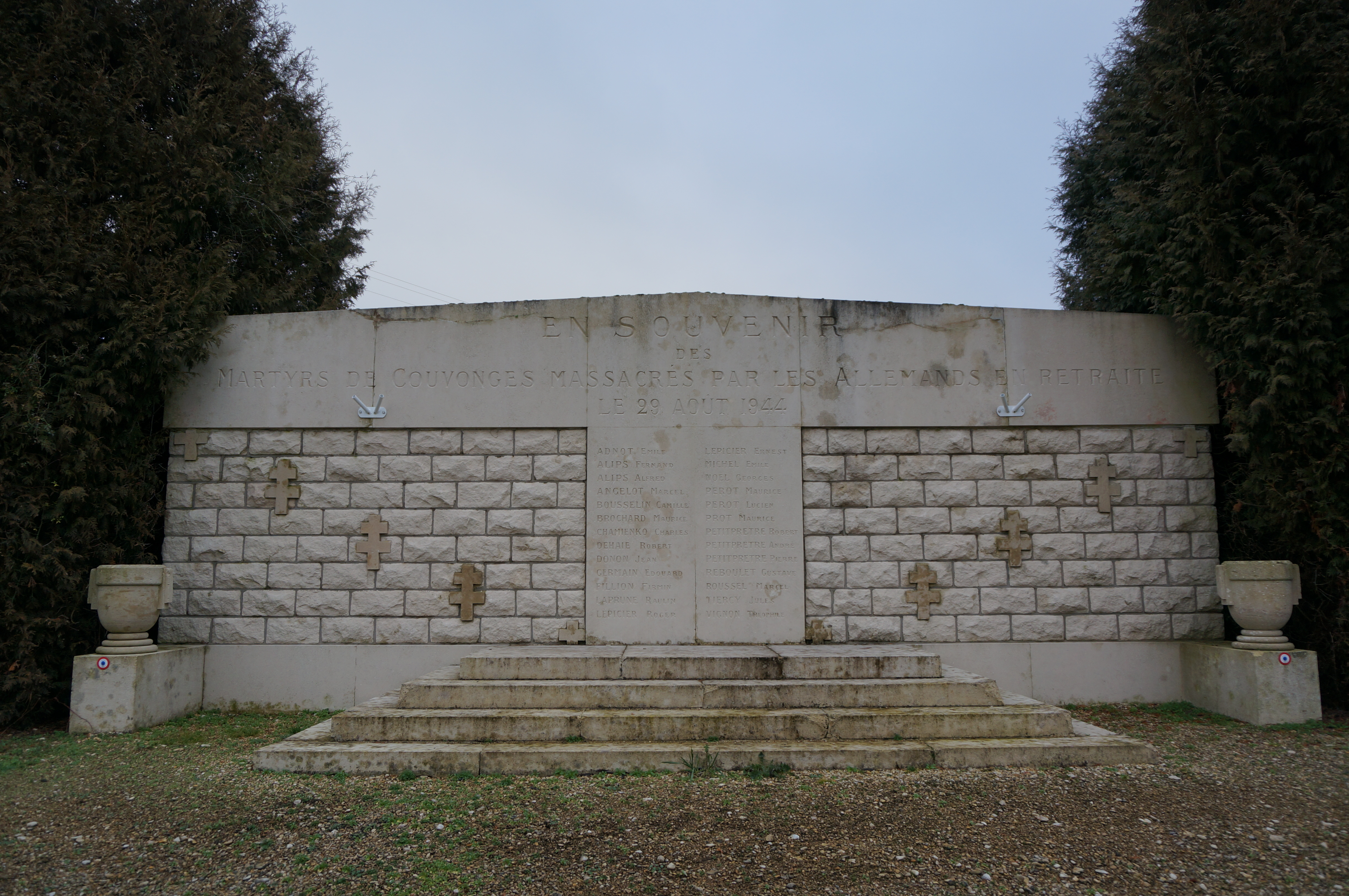
- WWII memorial

- Coat of arms
- Location of Beurey-sur-Saulx
- Location within France Location within Grand Est
- Coordinates: 48°45′31″N 5°01′40″E
- Country: France
- Region: Grand Est
- Department: Meuse
- Arrondissement: Bar-le-Duc
- Canton: Revigny-sur-Ornain
- Intercommunality: CA Bar-le-Duc - Sud Meuse

Government
  - Mayor (2020–2026): Gérard Fillon
- Area^{1}: 11.62 km^{2} (4.49 sq mi)
- Elevation: 150 m (490 ft)
- Highest elevation: 235 m (771 ft)
- Lowest elevation: 148 m (486 ft)
- Population (2023): 412
  - Density: 35.5/km^{2} (91.8/sq mi)
- Time zone: UTC+01:00 (CET)
  - Summer (DST): UTC+02:00 (CEST)
- INSEE/Postal code: 55049 /55000
- ^{1} French Land Register data, which excludes lakes, ponds, glaciers > 1 km^{2} (0.386 sq mi or 247 acres) and river estuaries.

Beurey-sur-Saulx (French pronunciation: [bœʁɛ syʁ so], literally Beurey on Saulx) is a commune in the Meuse department in the Grand Est region in northeastern France.

On 29 August 1944, the 3rd Panzergenadier Division of the German Wehrmacht massacred 86 inhabitants of this and the three neighboring villages of Robert-Espagne, Couvonges and Mognéville. This is also referred to as the Massacre de la vallée de la Saulx. In Beurey-sur-Saulx, the deputy mayor Mr. Aimé Honoré, Mr. Paul Fenaux and Mr. Eugene Francis were shot in front of their homes.

Charles de Gaulle participated in a memorial service on 28 July 1946. A memorial was inaugurated on 29 August 1949 by General André Zeller, commander of the 6th military region.

== Population ==
Historical population
Year	Pop.	±% p.a.
1968	502	—
1975	512	+0.28%
1982	505	−0.20%
1990	525	+0.49%
1999	495	−0.65%
2007	448	−1.24%
2012	428	−0.91%
2017	417	−0.52%
2023	412	−0.20%
Source: INSEE

== See also ==
- Communes of the Meuse department
- Massacre de la vallée de la Saulx
- HOMMAGE AUX MARTYRS DE LA VALLÉE DE LA SAULX des villages de Robert-Espagne - Beurey-sur-Saulx - Couvonges - Mognéville - Trémont-sur-Saulx. (in French)
