= Changy =

Changy is the name or part of the name of the following communes in France:

- Changy, Loire, in the Loire department
- Changy, Marne, in the Marne department
- Changy, Saône-et-Loire, in the Saône-et-Loire department
- Chevannes-Changy, in the Nièvre department
- Varennes-Changy, in the Loiret department
