= Revigny-sur-Ornain =

- Commune
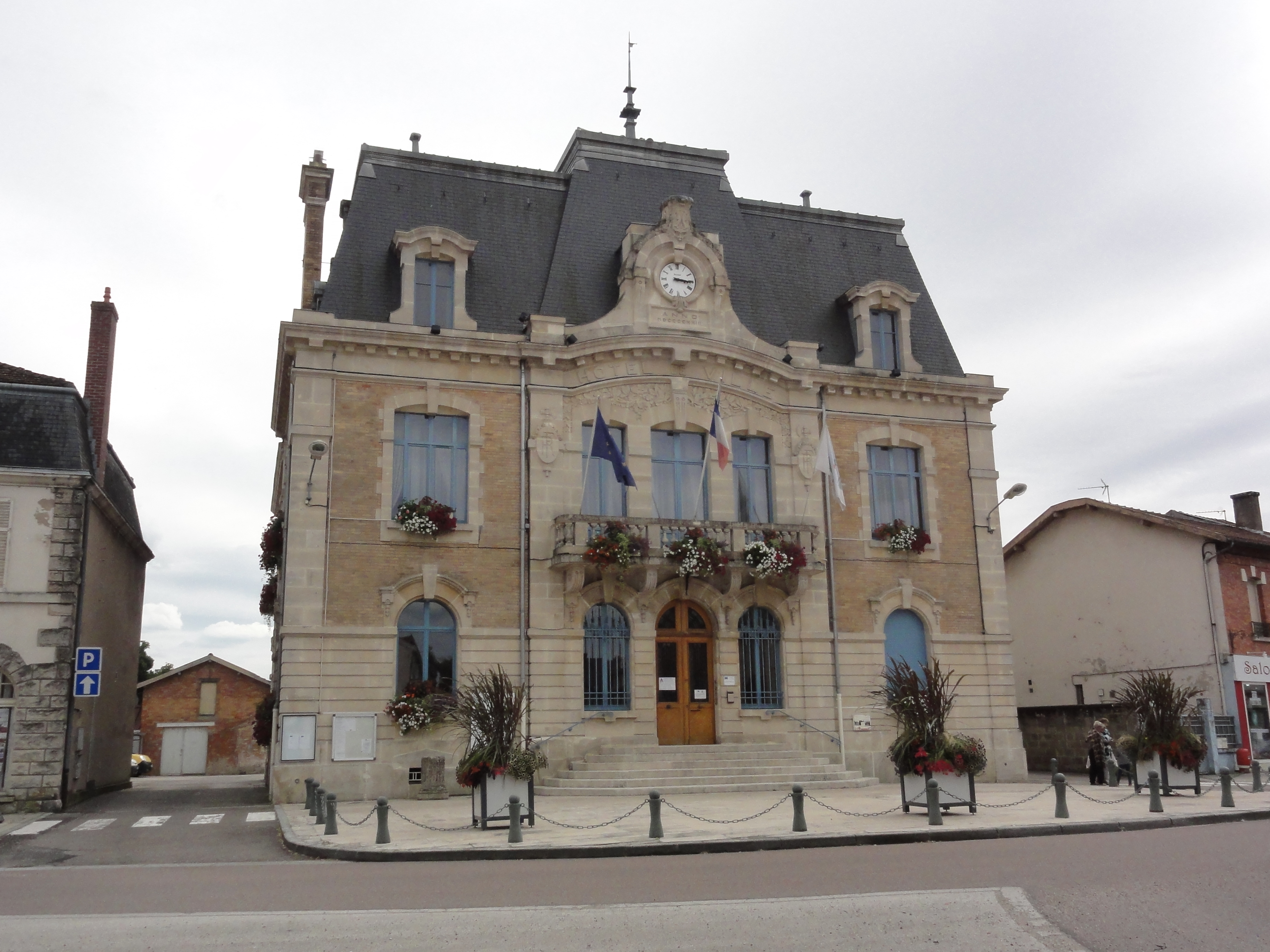
- The town hall in Revigny-sur-Ornain

- Coat of arms
- Location of Revigny-sur-Ornain
- Location within France Location within Grand Est
- Coordinates: 48°49′44″N 4°59′17″E
- Country: France
- Region: Grand Est
- Department: Meuse
- Arrondissement: Bar-le-Duc
- Canton: Revigny-sur-Ornain
- Intercommunality: Pays de Revigny-sur-Ornain

Government
  - Mayor (2020–2026): Pierre Burgain
- Area^{1}: 19.32 km^{2} (7.46 sq mi)
- Elevation: 146 m (479 ft)
- Highest elevation: 182 m (597 ft)
- Lowest elevation: 134 m (440 ft)
- Population (2023): 2,499
  - Density: 129.3/km^{2} (335.0/sq mi)
- Time zone: UTC+01:00 (CET)
  - Summer (DST): UTC+02:00 (CEST)
- INSEE/Postal code: 55427 /55800
- ^{1} French Land Register data, which excludes lakes, ponds, glaciers > 1 km^{2} (0.386 sq mi or 247 acres) and river estuaries.

Revigny-sur-Ornain (French pronunciation: [ʁəviɲi syʁ ɔʁnɛ̃], literally Revigny on Ornain) is a commune in the Meuse department in Grand Est in north-eastern France.

== Geography ==
The Chée, a tributary of the Saulx, forms part of the commune's north-western border.

The Ornain, another tributary of the Saulx, flows southwestward through the middle of the commune and crosses the village.

== Population ==
Historical population
Year	Pop.	±% p.a.
1968	3,955	—
1975	4,077	+0.43%
1982	4,054	−0.08%
1990	3,528	−1.72%
1999	3,660	+0.41%
2007	3,206	−1.64%
2012	3,005	−1.29%
2017	2,805	−1.37%
2023	2,499	−1.91%
Source: INSEE

== See also ==
- Communes of the Meuse department
