= Alliancelles =

- Commune
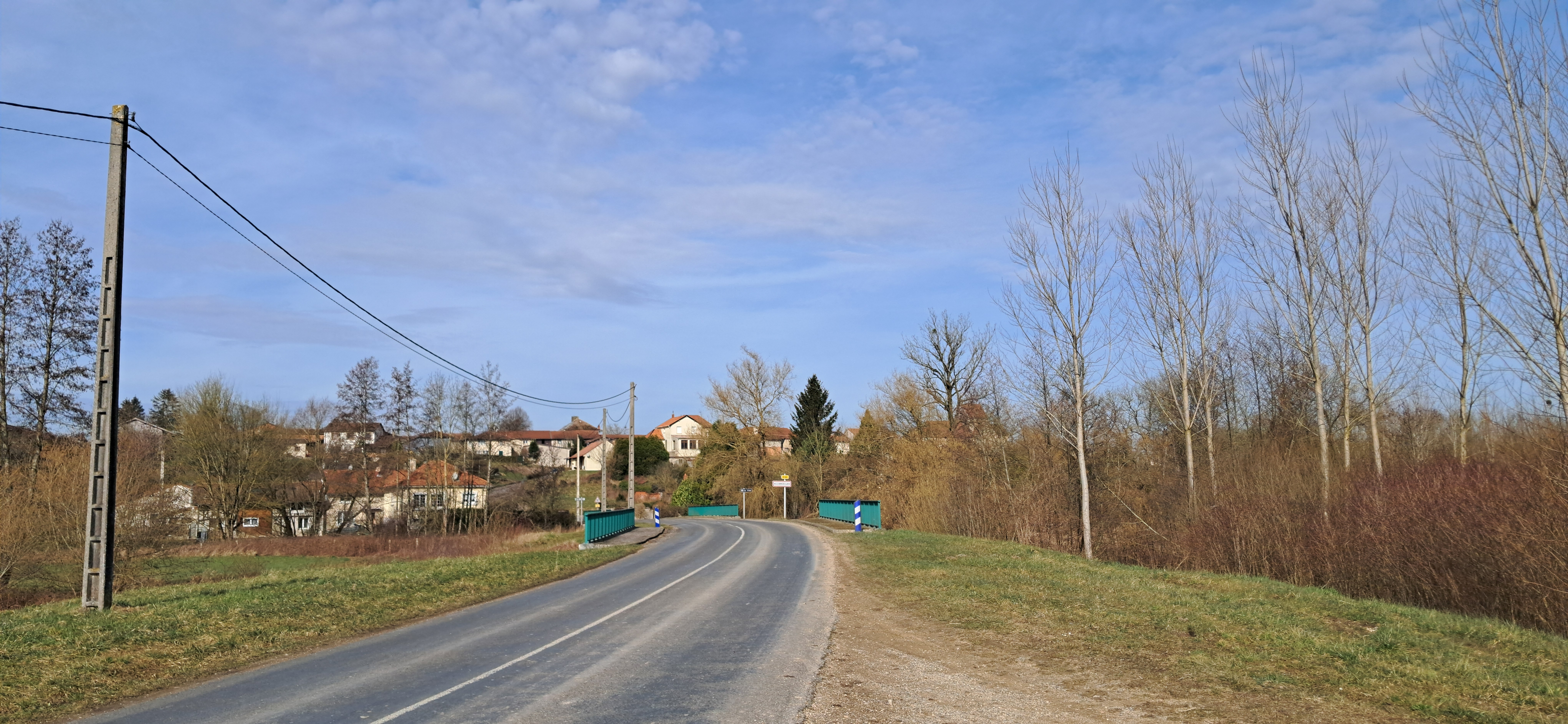
- The road into Alliancelles
- Location of Alliancelles
- Location within France Location within Grand Est
- Coordinates: 48°48′38″N 4°53′00″E
- Country: France
- Region: Grand Est
- Department: Marne
- Arrondissement: Vitry-le-François
- Canton: Sermaize-les-Bains

Government
  - Mayor (2020–2026): Jean-Jacques Garcia Delgado
- Area^{1}: 6.93 km^{2} (2.68 sq mi)
- Population (2023): 148
  - Density: 21.4/km^{2} (55.3/sq mi)
- Time zone: UTC+01:00 (CET)
  - Summer (DST): UTC+02:00 (CEST)
- INSEE/Postal code: 51006 /51250
- ^{1} French Land Register data, which excludes lakes, ponds, glaciers > 1 km^{2} (0.386 sq mi or 247 acres) and river estuaries.

Alliancelles (French pronunciation: [aljɑ̃sɛl]) is a commune in the Marne department in northeastern France.

== Geography ==
The village lies on the right bank of the Chée, which flows southwest through the commune.

The Ornain flows southwest through the southern part of the commune.

== Population ==
Historical population
Year	Pop.	±% p.a.
1968	179	—
1975	153	−2.22%
1982	126	−2.74%
1990	142	+1.51%
1999	132	−0.81%
2007	145	+1.18%
2012	147	+0.27%
2017	142	−0.69%
2023	148	+0.69%
Source: INSEE

== See also ==
- Communes of the Marne department
