= Jussecourt-Minecourt =

- Commune
- Location of Jussecourt-Minecourt
- Location within France Location within Grand Est
- Coordinates: 48°47′24″N 4°47′20″E
- Country: France
- Region: Grand Est
- Department: Marne
- Arrondissement: Vitry-le-François
- Canton: Sermaize-les-Bains
- Intercommunality: Côtes de Champagne et Val de Saulx

Government
  - Mayor (2020–2026): Vivianne Wirbel
- Area^{1}: 8.92 km^{2} (3.44 sq mi)
- Elevation: 105 m (344 ft)
- Population (2023): 193
  - Density: 21.6/km^{2} (56.0/sq mi)
- Time zone: UTC+01:00 (CET)
  - Summer (DST): UTC+02:00 (CEST)
- INSEE/Postal code: 51311 /51340
- ^{1} French Land Register data, which excludes lakes, ponds, glaciers > 1 km^{2} (0.386 sq mi or 247 acres) and river estuaries.

Jussecourt-Minecourt (French pronunciation: [ʒyskuʁ minkuʁ]) is a commune in the Marne department in north-eastern France.

== Geography ==
The Chée flows west-southwestward through the commune.

== See also ==
- Communes of the Marne department
