= Mognéville =

- Commune
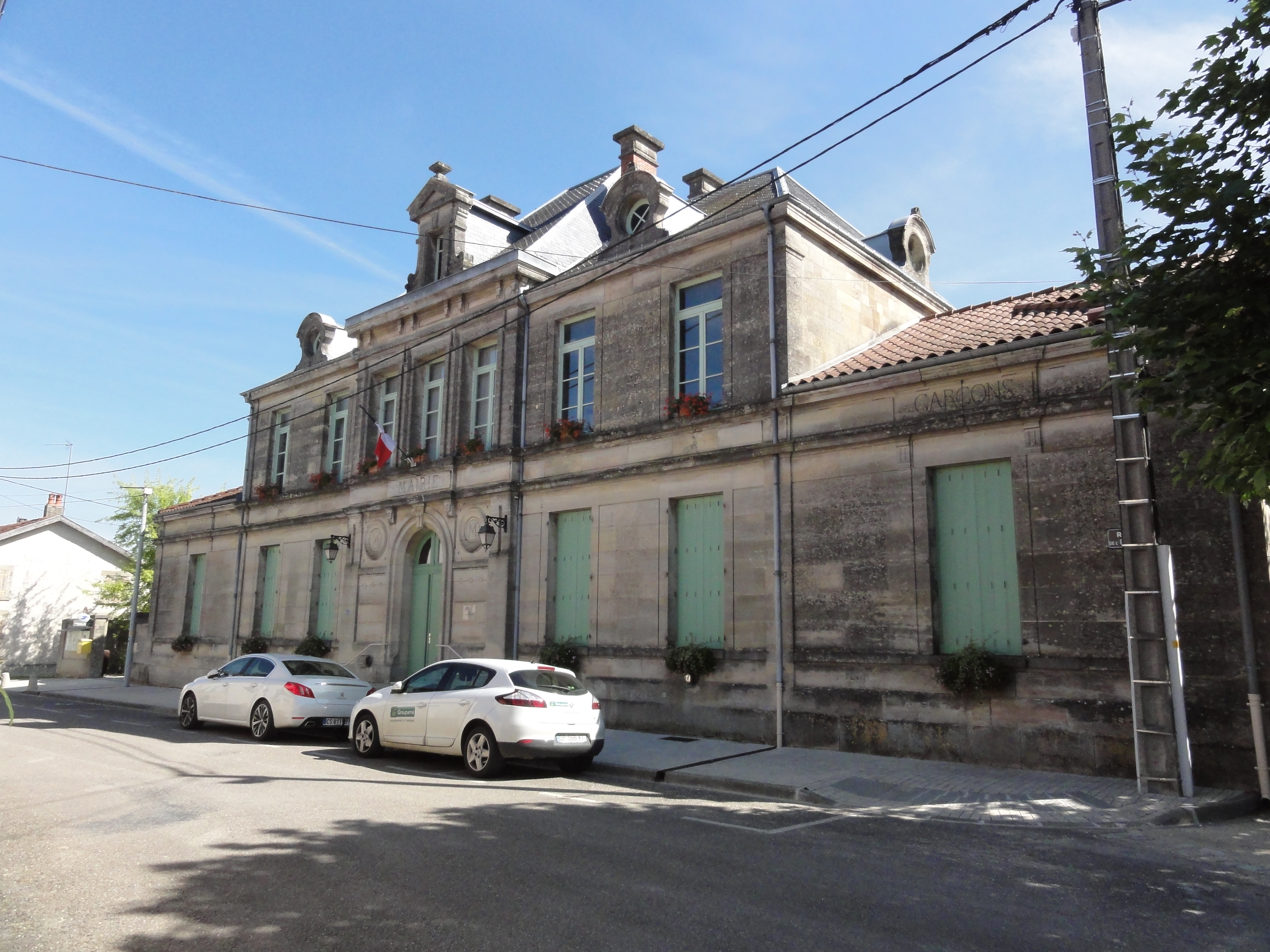
- The town hall in Mognéville

- Coat of arms
- Location of Mognéville
- Location within France Location within Grand Est
- Coordinates: 48°47′02″N 5°00′20″E
- Country: France
- Region: Grand Est
- Department: Meuse
- Arrondissement: Bar-le-Duc
- Canton: Revigny-sur-Ornain
- Intercommunality: CC du Pays de Revigny-sur-Ornain

Government
  - Mayor (2020–2026): Richard Siri
- Area^{1}: 18.57 km^{2} (7.17 sq mi)
- Elevation: 145 m (476 ft)
- Highest elevation: 216 m (709 ft)
- Lowest elevation: 136 m (446 ft)
- Population (2023): 358
  - Density: 19.3/km^{2} (49.9/sq mi)
- Time zone: UTC+01:00 (CET)
  - Summer (DST): UTC+02:00 (CEST)
- INSEE/Postal code: 55340 /55800
- ^{1} French Land Register data, which excludes lakes, ponds, glaciers > 1 km^{2} (0.386 sq mi or 247 acres) and river estuaries.

Mognéville (French pronunciation: [mɔɲevil]) is a commune in the Meuse department in Grand Est in north-eastern France.

On 29 August 1944, the 3rd Panzergenadier Division of the German Wehrmacht massacred 86 inhabitants of this and the three neighboring villages of Beurey-sur-Saulx, Couvonges and Robert-Espagne. This is also referred to as the Massacre de la vallée de la Saulx.

== See also ==
- Communes of the Meuse department
