= Brabant-le-Roi =

- Commune
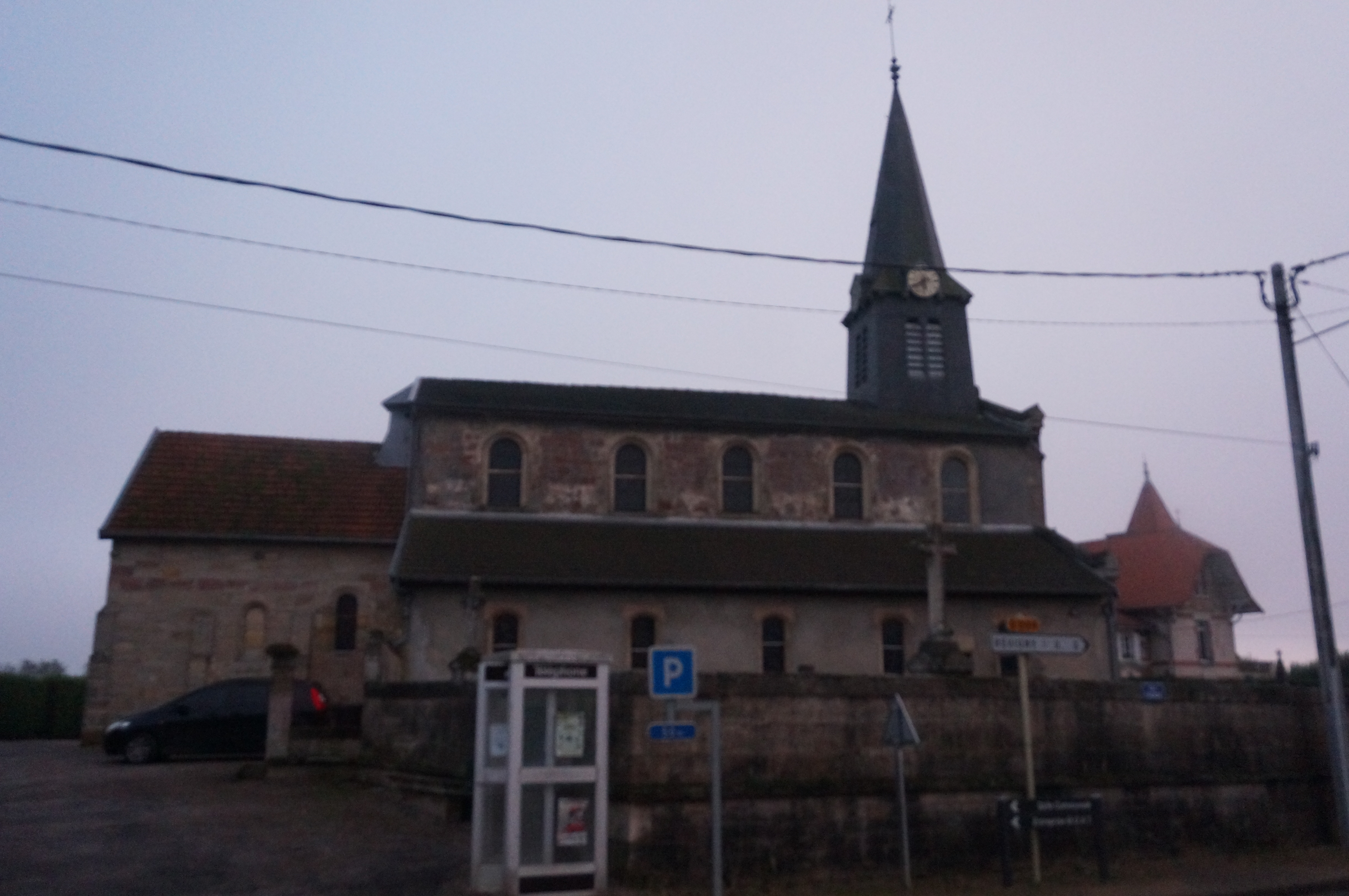
- The church in Brabant-le-Roi

- Coat of arms
- Location of Brabant-le-Roi
- Location within France Location within Grand Est
- Coordinates: 48°50′47″N 4°59′02″E
- Country: France
- Region: Grand Est
- Department: Meuse
- Arrondissement: Bar-le-Duc
- Canton: Revigny-sur-Ornain
- Intercommunality: Pays de Revigny sur Ornain

Government
  - Mayor (2020–2026): Gerard Raffner
- Area^{1}: 11.08 km^{2} (4.28 sq mi)
- Elevation: 145 m (476 ft)
- Highest elevation: 187 m (614 ft)
- Lowest elevation: 137 m (449 ft)
- Population (2023): 221
  - Density: 19.9/km^{2} (51.7/sq mi)
- Time zone: UTC+01:00 (CET)
  - Summer (DST): UTC+02:00 (CEST)
- INSEE/Postal code: 55069 /55800
- ^{1} French Land Register data, which excludes lakes, ponds, glaciers > 1 km^{2} (0.386 sq mi or 247 acres) and river estuaries.

Brabant-le-Roi (French pronunciation: [bʁabɑ̃ lə ʁwa]) is a commune in the Meuse department in Grand Est in northeastern France. The priest and Encyclopédiste Charles Millot died in Brabant-le-Roi 9 June 1769.

== Geography ==
The village lies in the southern part of the commune on the right bank of the Nausonce, a tributary of the Chée, which forms part of the commune's western border.

== Population ==
Historical population
Year	Pop.	±% p.a.
1968	168	—
1975	202	+2.67%
1982	235	+2.19%
1990	241	+0.32%
1999	234	−0.33%
2007	251	+0.88%
2012	225	−2.16%
2017	230	+0.44%
2023	221	−0.66%
Source: INSEE

== See also ==
- Communes of the Meuse department
