= Vitry-en-Perthois =

- Commune
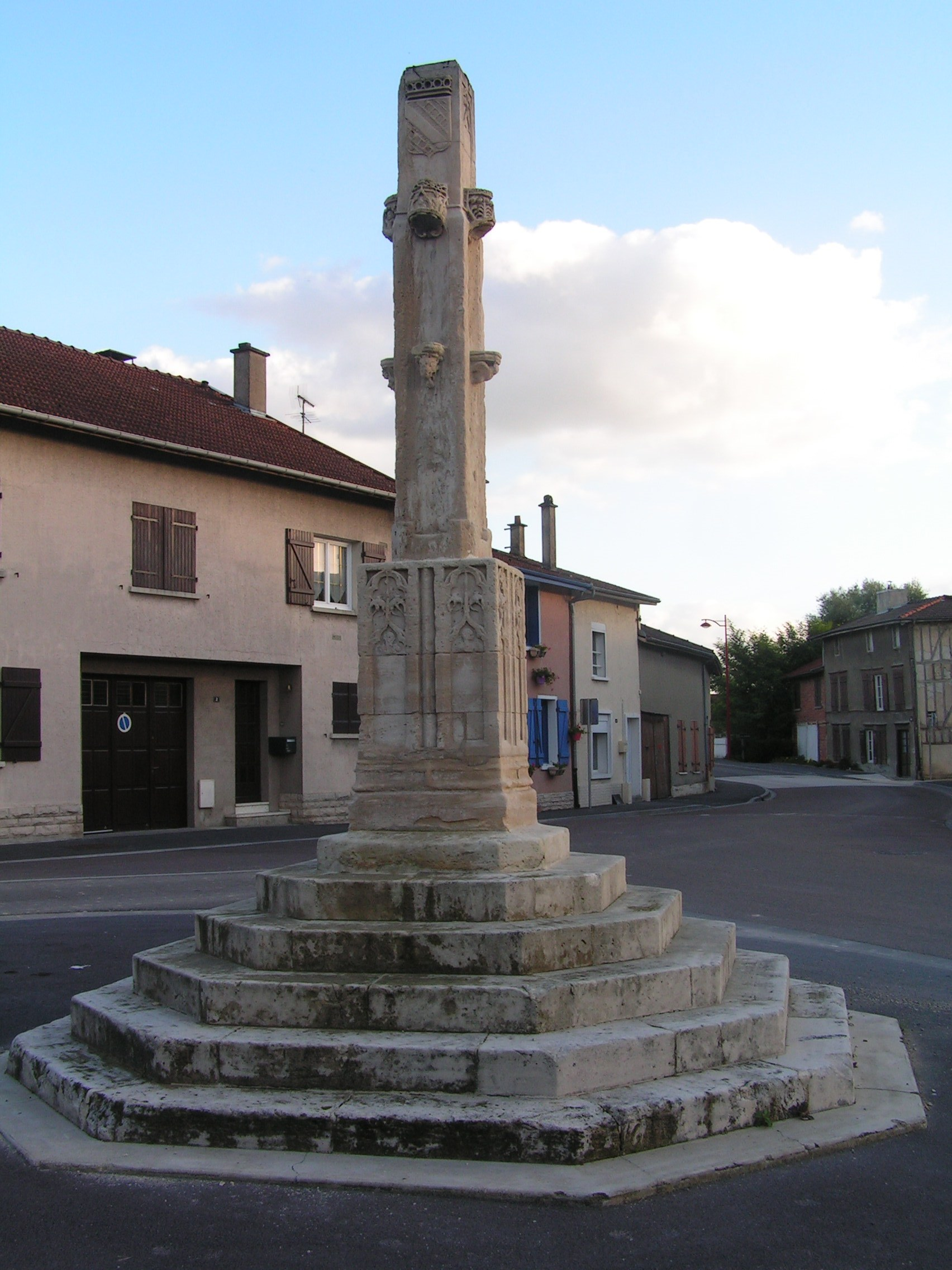
- The calvary in Vitry-en-Perthois

- Coat of arms
- Location of Vitry-en-Perthois
- Location within France Location within Grand Est
- Coordinates: 48°44′54″N 4°37′32″E
- Country: France
- Region: Grand Est
- Department: Marne
- Arrondissement: Vitry-le-François
- Canton: Sermaize-les-Bains
- Intercommunality: Côtes de Champagne et Val de Saulx

Government
  - Mayor (2020–2026): Hugues Gérardin
- Area^{1}: 17.49 km^{2} (6.75 sq mi)
- Elevation: 96 m (315 ft)
- Population (2023): 863
  - Density: 49.3/km^{2} (128/sq mi)
- Time zone: UTC+01:00 (CET)
  - Summer (DST): UTC+02:00 (CEST)
- INSEE/Postal code: 51647 /51300
- ^{1} French Land Register data, which excludes lakes, ponds, glaciers > 1 km^{2} (0.386 sq mi or 247 acres) and river estuaries.

Vitry-en-Perthois (French pronunciation: [vitʁi ɑ̃ pɛʁtwa]) is a commune in Marne, a department in northeastern France.

== History ==
Its history dates back to the Roman period. The destruction of Perthes by the Huns in 451 made Vitry the largest city and thus the new capital of Perthois. Vitry was part of Austrasia submitted to Neustria in 613.

In 929, Boson, brother of King Raoul, built a castle in Vitry, which was later disputed with the Counts of Vermandois. In 1077, this castle fell to the Counts of Champagne. Vitry became the capital of a county castellany, then of a provostship and a bailiwick.

In 1544, Vitry-en-Perthois was entirely destroyed by the forces of Holy Roman Emperor Charles V during the Italian War of 1542–46. The following year in 1545 King Francis commissioned the new town of Vitry-le-Francois on a new site 2.5 miles to the North-East as a replacement for the destroyed Vitry-en-Perthois.

== Geography ==
The Chée flows into the Saulx in the northern part of the commune.

The Saulx forms part of the commune's eastern border, then flows westward through the commune and crosses the village.

== See also ==
- Communes of the Marne department
