= Bettancourt-la-Longue =

- Commune
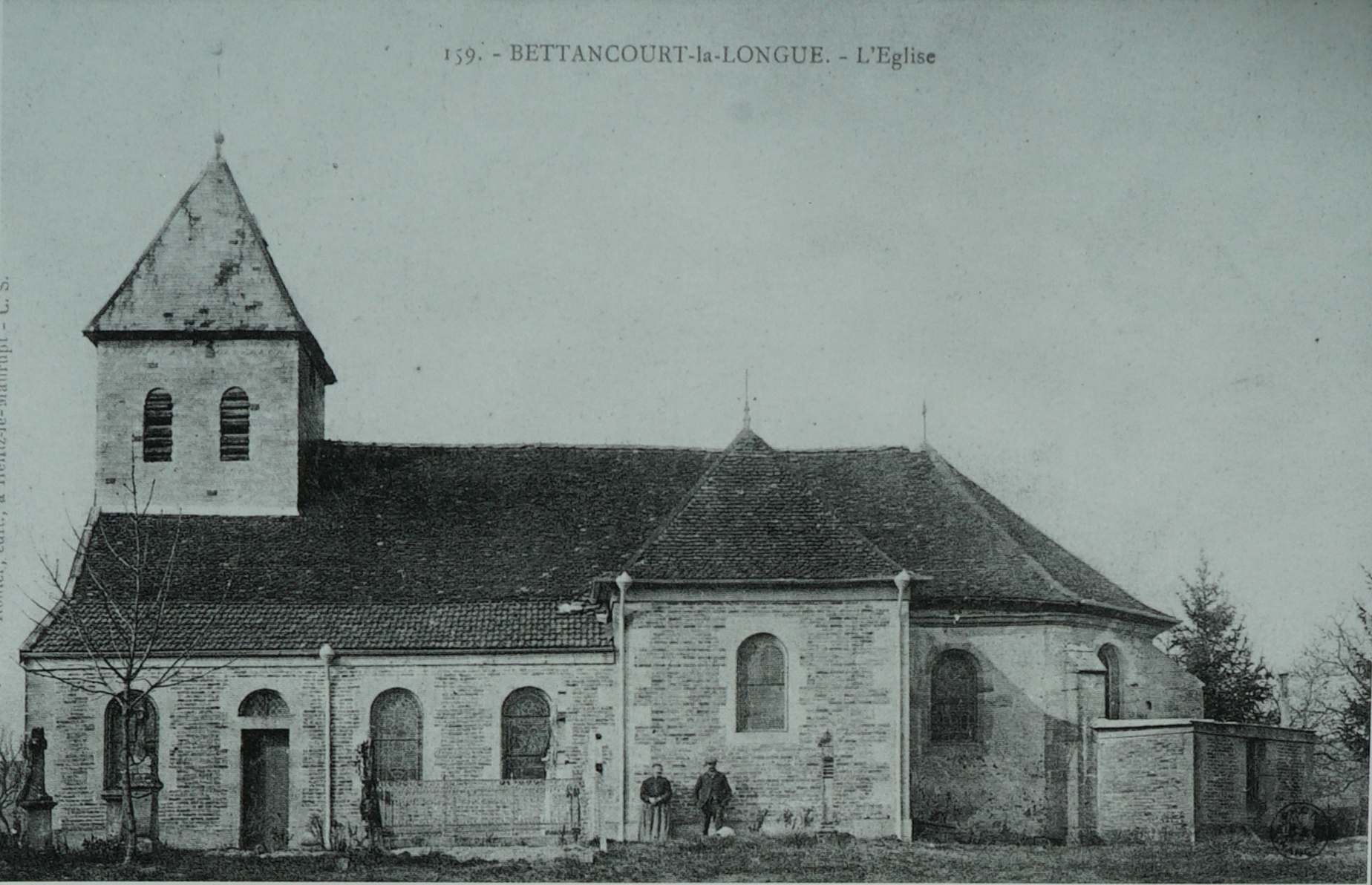
- The church in 1912
- Location of Bettancourt-la-Longue
- Location within France Location within Grand Est
- Coordinates: 48°49′46″N 4°53′21″E
- Country: France
- Region: Grand Est
- Department: Marne
- Arrondissement: Vitry-le-François
- Canton: Sermaize-les-Bains

Government
  - Mayor (2020–2026): Jean-Marie Tassinari
- Area^{1}: 6.09 km^{2} (2.35 sq mi)
- Population (2023): 75
  - Density: 12/km^{2} (32/sq mi)
- Time zone: UTC+01:00 (CET)
  - Summer (DST): UTC+02:00 (CEST)
- INSEE/Postal code: 51057 /51330
- ^{1} French Land Register data, which excludes lakes, ponds, glaciers > 1 km^{2} (0.386 sq mi or 247 acres) and river estuaries.

Bettancourt-la-Longue (French pronunciation: [bɛtɑ̃kuʁ la lɔ̃ɡ]) is a commune in the Marne department in northeastern France.

== Geography ==
The village lies on the right bank of the Chée, which flows southwest through the southeastern part of the commune.

== Population ==
Historical population
Year	Pop.	±% p.a.
1968	94	—
1975	79	−2.45%
1982	81	+0.36%
1990	78	−0.47%
1999	72	−0.89%
2007	87	+2.39%
2012	85	−0.46%
2017	78	−1.70%
2023	75	−0.65%
Source: INSEE

== See also ==
- Communes of the Marne department
