= Montiers-sur-Saulx =

- Commune
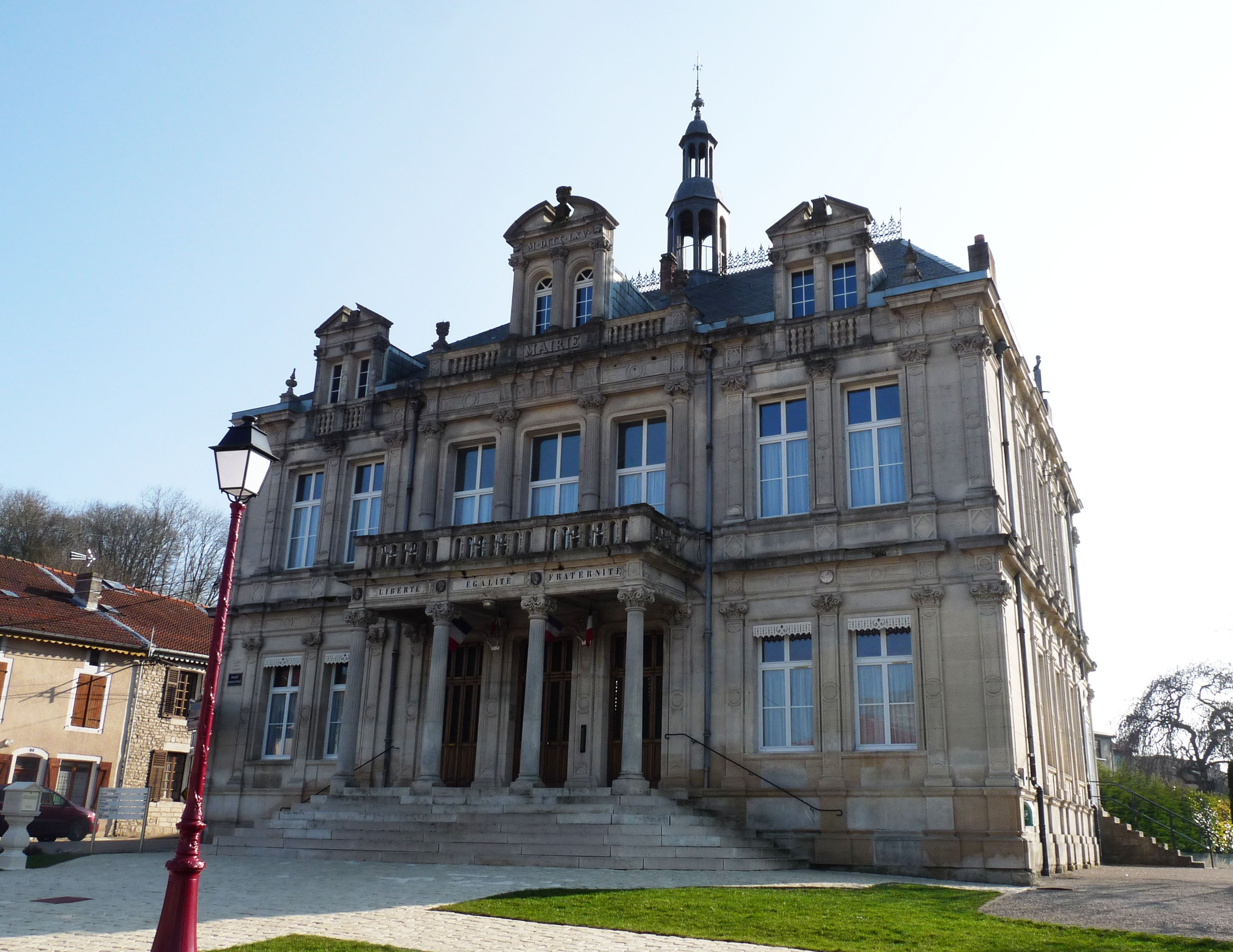
- The town hall in Montiers-sur-Saulx

- Coat of arms
- Location of Montiers-sur-Saulx
- Location within France Location within Grand Est
- Coordinates: 48°31′54″N 5°16′08″E
- Country: France
- Region: Grand Est
- Department: Meuse
- Arrondissement: Bar-le-Duc
- Canton: Ligny-en-Barrois
- Intercommunality: CC Portes de Meuse

Government
  - Mayor (2020–2026): Didier Grosjean
- Area^{1}: 45.92 km^{2} (17.73 sq mi)
- Population (2023): 365
  - Density: 7.95/km^{2} (20.6/sq mi)
- Time zone: UTC+01:00 (CET)
  - Summer (DST): UTC+02:00 (CEST)
- INSEE/Postal code: 55348 /55290
- ^{1} French Land Register data, which excludes lakes, ponds, glaciers > 1 km^{2} (0.386 sq mi or 247 acres) and river estuaries.

Montiers-sur-Saulx (French pronunciation: [mɔ̃tje syʁ so], literally Montiers on Saulx) is a commune in the Meuse department in Grand Est in north-eastern France.

== See also ==
- Communes of the Meuse department
