= Chée =

River in France

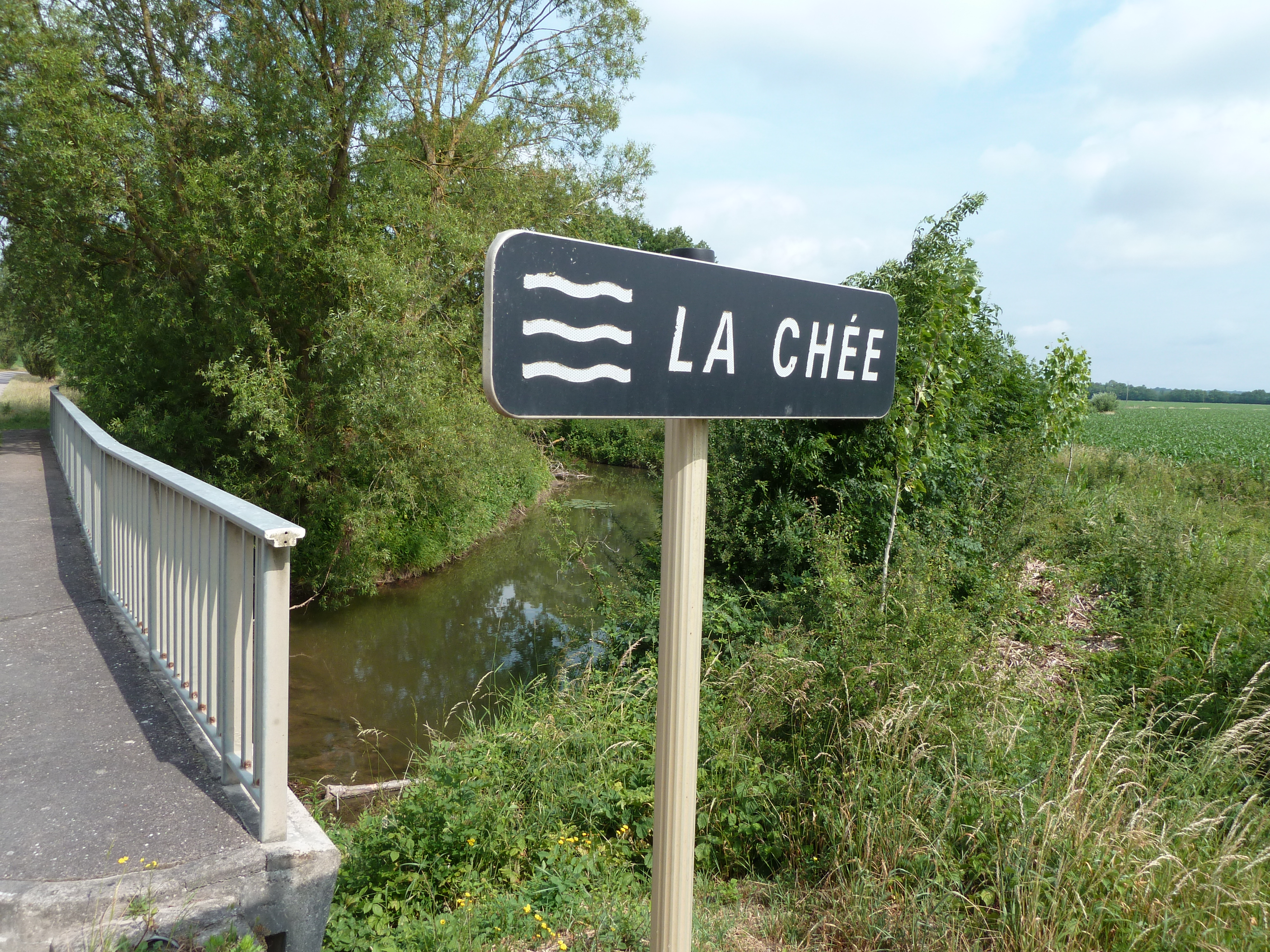

- Location within France Location within Grand Est

Location
- Country: France

Physical characteristics
- Source
  - location: Les Hauts-de-Chée
  - coordinates: 48°52′43″N 05°12′56″E
  - elevation: 250 m (820 ft)
- Mouth
  - location: Saulx
  - coordinates: 48°45′08″N 04°38′47″E
  - elevation: 95 m (312 ft)
- Length: 68.6 km (42.6 mi)
- Basin size: 400 km^{2} (150 sq mi)
- Discharge
  - average: 4 m^{3}/s (140 cu ft/s)

Basin features
- Progression: Saulx→ Marne→ Seine→ English Channel

The Chée (French pronunciation: [ʃe]) is a 68.6-kilometre (42.6 mi) long river in the Meuse and Marne départements, northeastern France. Its source is in the Barrois, near Marat-la-Grande, a hamlet in Les Hauts-de-Chée. It flows generally southwest. It is a right tributary of the Saulx into which it flows at Vitry-en-Perthois, near Vitry-le-François.

Its main tributary is the Vière.

== Départements and communes along its course ==
This list is ordered from source to mouth:

- Meuse: Les Hauts-de-Chée, Rembercourt-Sommaisne, Louppy-le-Château, Villotte-devant-Louppy, Laheycourt, Noyers-Auzécourt, Nettancourt, Brabant-le-Roi, Revigny-sur-Ornain
- Marne: Vroil, Bettancourt-la-Longue, Alliancelles, Heiltz-le-Maurupt, Jussecourt-Minecourt, Heiltz-l'Évêque, Outrepont, Changy, Merlaut, Vitry-en-Perthois
