= Outrepont =

- Commune
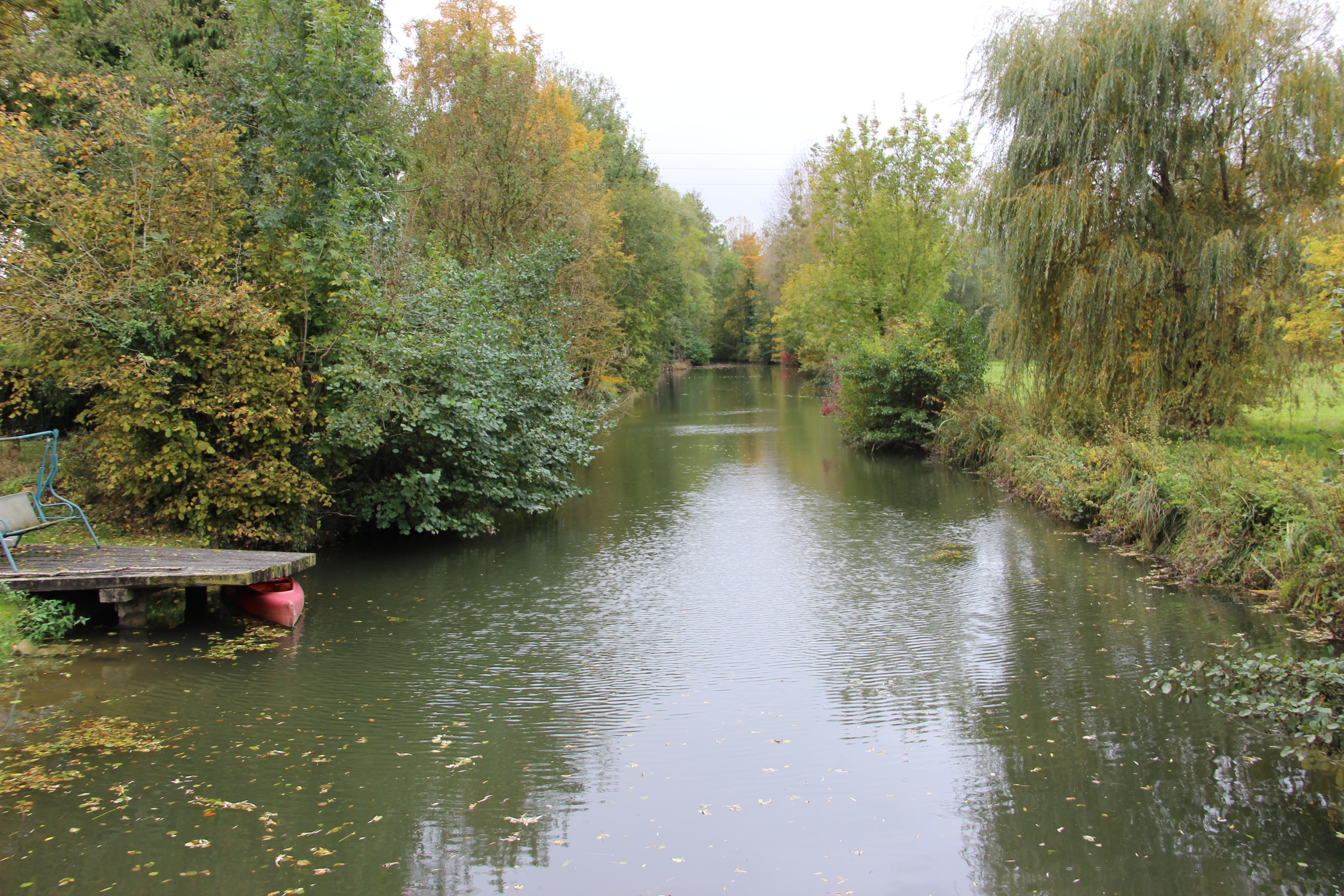
- The Chée river at Outrepont
- Location of Outrepont
- Location within France Location within Grand Est
- Coordinates: 48°46′05″N 4°40′57″E
- Country: France
- Region: Grand Est
- Department: Marne
- Arrondissement: Vitry-le-François
- Canton: Sermaize-les-Bains
- Intercommunality: Côtes de Champagne et Val de Saulx

Government
  - Mayor (2020–2026): Philippe Remiet
- Area^{1}: 3.72 km^{2} (1.44 sq mi)
- Elevation: 101 m (331 ft)
- Population (2023): 74
  - Density: 20/km^{2} (52/sq mi)
- Time zone: UTC+01:00 (CET)
  - Summer (DST): UTC+02:00 (CEST)
- INSEE/Postal code: 51420 /51300
- ^{1} French Land Register data, which excludes lakes, ponds, glaciers > 1 km^{2} (0.386 sq mi or 247 acres) and river estuaries.

Outrepont (French pronunciation: [utʁəpɔ̃]) is a commune in the Marne department in north-eastern France.

== Geography ==
The village lies on the left bank of the Chée, which flows southwestward through the northern part of the commune and forms most of its northern border and part of its western border.

== See also ==
- Communes of the Marne department
