= Loisey =

- Commune
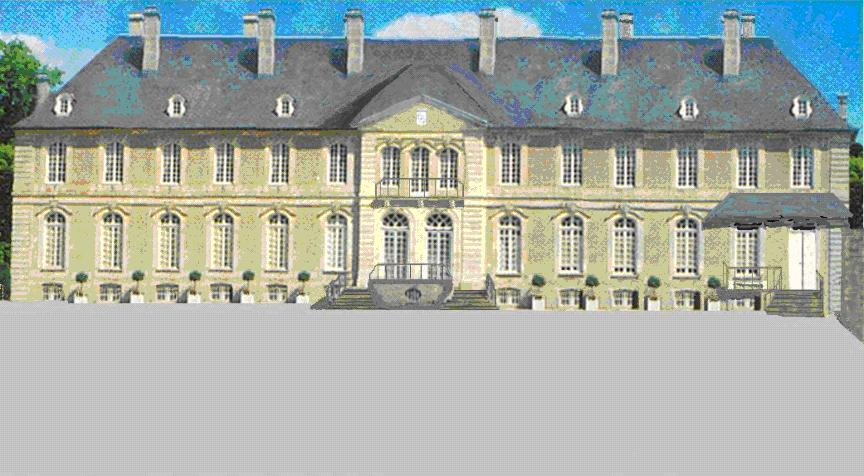
- Reconstruction of the castle of Loisey

- Coat of arms
- Location of Loisey
- Location within France Location within Grand Est
- Coordinates: 48°45′52″N 5°17′02″E
- Country: France
- Region: Grand Est
- Department: Meuse
- Arrondissement: Bar-le-Duc
- Canton: Vaucouleurs
- Intercommunality: CA Bar-le-Duc - Sud Meuse

Government
  - Mayor (2020–2026): Serge Nicolas
- Area^{1}: 13.47 km^{2} (5.20 sq mi)
- Population (2023): 270
  - Density: 20/km^{2} (52/sq mi)
- Time zone: UTC+01:00 (CET)
  - Summer (DST): UTC+02:00 (CEST)
- INSEE/Postal code: 55298 /55000
- ^{1} French Land Register data, which excludes lakes, ponds, glaciers > 1 km^{2} (0.386 sq mi or 247 acres) and river estuaries.

Loisey (French pronunciation: [lwazɛ]) is a commune in the Meuse department in Grand Est in north-eastern France. Between 1973 and 2014 it was part of the commune Loisey-Culey. The Encyclopédiste Charles Millot was priest of Loisey from 1743 to 1769.

== See also ==
- Communes of the Meuse department
