= Vroil =

- Commune
- Location of Vroil
- Location within France Location within Grand Est
- Coordinates: 48°50′35″N 4°54′48″E
- Country: France
- Region: Grand Est
- Department: Marne
- Arrondissement: Vitry-le-François
- Canton: Sermaize-les-Bains
- Intercommunality: Côtes de Champagne et Val de Saulx

Government
  - Mayor (2020–2026): Gérard Chrétien
- Area^{1}: 10.34 km^{2} (3.99 sq mi)
- Elevation: 150 m (490 ft)
- Population (2023): 103
  - Density: 9.96/km^{2} (25.8/sq mi)
- Time zone: UTC+01:00 (CET)
  - Summer (DST): UTC+02:00 (CEST)
- INSEE/Postal code: 51658 /51330
- ^{1} French Land Register data, which excludes lakes, ponds, glaciers > 1 km^{2} (0.386 sq mi or 247 acres) and river estuaries.

Vroil (French pronunciation: [vʁwal]) is a commune in the Marne department in north-eastern France.

== Geography ==
The village lies above the right bank of the Chée, which flows southwestward through the south-eastern part of the commune.

== See also ==
- Communes of the Marne department
