= Charles Millot (encyclopédiste) =

Charles Millot (circa 1717 in Duchy of Lorraine – 9 June 1769, Brabant-le-Roi) was an 18th-century cleric.

A priest of Loisey from 1743 to 1769 then in Brabant-le-Roi until his death, Millot contributed the Encyclopédie by Diderot and D'Alembert the articles affabilité and entêtement, where he attacked the great and the devotees.

He was a member of the Société littéraire de Châlons-sur-Marne.

== Bibliography ==
- Frank Arthur Kafker, The Encyclopedists as individuals: a biographical dictionary of the authors of the Encyclopédie, Oxford, Studies on Voltaire and the eighteenth Century, 1988, p. 258. ISBN 0-7294-0368-8
