= Heiltz-le-Maurupt =

- Commune
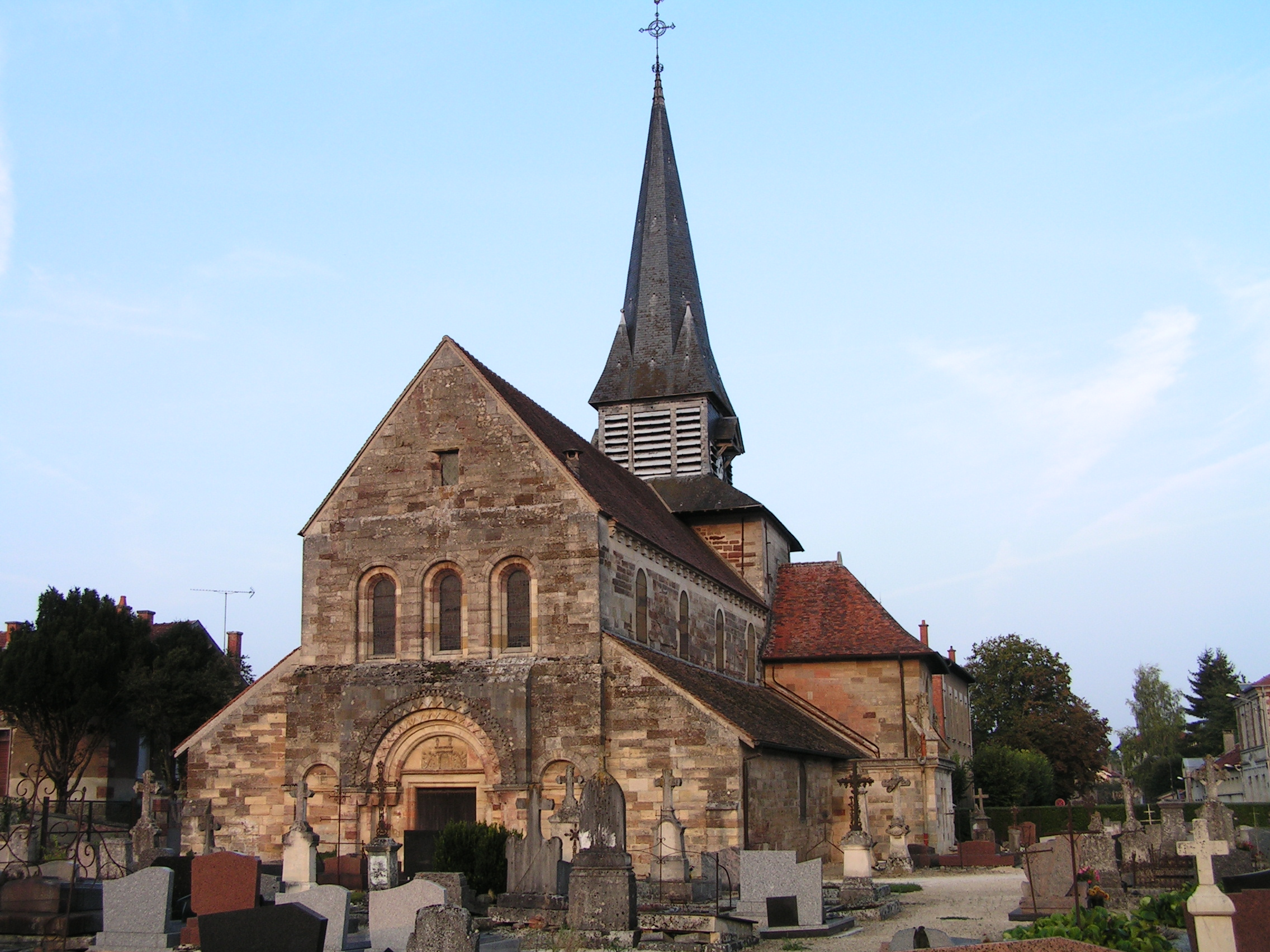
- The church in Heiltz-le-Maurupt

- Coat of arms
- Location of Heiltz-le-Maurupt
- Location within France Location within Grand Est
- Coordinates: 48°47′37″N 4°48′56″E
- Country: France
- Region: Grand Est
- Department: Marne
- Arrondissement: Vitry-le-François
- Canton: Sermaize-les-Bains
- Intercommunality: Côtes de Champagne et Val de Saulx
- Area^{1}: 16.27 km^{2} (6.28 sq mi)
- Elevation: 118 m (387 ft)
- Population (2023): 429
  - Density: 26.4/km^{2} (68.3/sq mi)
- Time zone: UTC+01:00 (CET)
  - Summer (DST): UTC+02:00 (CEST)
- INSEE/Postal code: 51289 /51340
- ^{1} French Land Register data, which excludes lakes, ponds, glaciers > 1 km^{2} (0.386 sq mi or 247 acres) and river estuaries.

Heiltz-le-Maurupt (French pronunciation: [ɛls lə moʁy]) is a commune in the Marne department in north-eastern France.

== Geography ==
The village lies on the right bank of the Chée, which flows westward through the middle of the commune.

The Ornain forms most of the commune's southern border.

== See also ==
- Communes of the Marne department
