= Couvonges =

- Commune
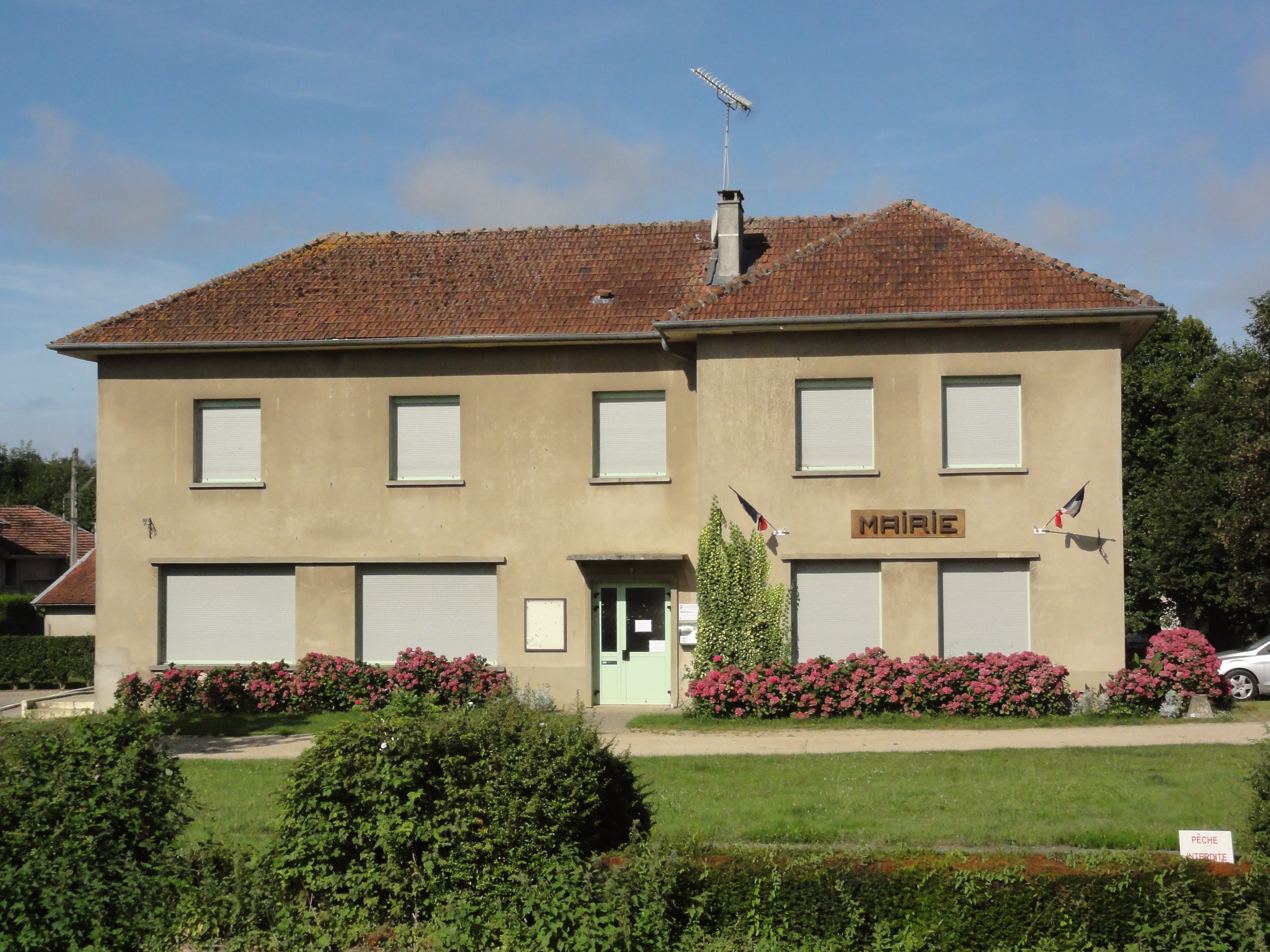
- The town hall in Couvonges

- Coat of arms
- Location of Couvonges
- Location within France Location within Grand Est
- Coordinates: 48°46′34″N 5°01′37″E
- Country: France
- Region: Grand Est
- Department: Meuse
- Arrondissement: Bar-le-Duc
- Canton: Revigny-sur-Ornain
- Intercommunality: CC du Pays de Revigny-sur-Ornain

Government
  - Mayor (2020–2026): Daniel Poirson
- Area^{1}: 4.56 km^{2} (1.76 sq mi)
- Elevation: 284 m (932 ft)
- Highest elevation: 208 m (682 ft)
- Lowest elevation: 146 m (479 ft)
- Population (2023): 156
  - Density: 34.2/km^{2} (88.6/sq mi)
- Time zone: UTC+01:00 (CET)
  - Summer (DST): UTC+02:00 (CEST)
- INSEE/Postal code: 55134 /55800
- ^{1} French Land Register data, which excludes lakes, ponds, glaciers > 1 km^{2} (0.386 sq mi or 247 acres) and river estuaries.

Couvonges (French pronunciation: [kuvɔ̃ʒ]) is a commune in the Meuse department in Grand Est in north-eastern France.

== Couvonges massacre ==
In August 1944 German troops en route to Saint-Dizier to face General George S. Patton's XII Corps killed a number of civilians and destroyed most of the town. This is also referred to as the Massacre de la vallée de la Saulx.

According to Edward R. Koudelka, Special Agent for the US Counter-Intelligence Corps, the 29th Regiment of the 3rd Panzergenadier Division was camped near a wooded area on the edge of town when a German officer and several soldiers were shot on 27 August by French resistance fighters. In retaliation, Major General Hans Hecker, who was in command of the division, ordered the execution by firing squad of twenty-six randomly selected Frenchmen. About sixty other civilians were killed in the neighboring towns of Robert-Espagne, Beurey-sur-Saulx and Mognéville.

The bodies were buried in a mass grave in a field near the town, but a local resident was able to obtain a photograph of the bodies before burial. According to Koudelka's informants, at 11 am on 29 August fifty-four of the town's sixty houses were burned, although the church was left standing. A total of 329 houses were looted and burned in the three towns.

=== Aftermath ===
Koudelka gathered evidence for use in the Nuremberg Trials, however Major General Hecker was released in 1947 and never tried. The case was assigned to the Military Court of Metz, which identified eight German soldiers (out of about fifty who participated in atrocities). In 1950, the four officers, two warrant officers and two soldiers were convicted. The judgment was delivered on 28 May 1952 and the sentences were pronounced in absentia: four received death sentences and four were sentenced to hard labor for life.

=== Memorial ===
Charles de Gaulle participated in a memorial service on 28 July 1946. A memorial was inaugurated on 29 August 1949 by General André Zeller, commander of the 6th military region. The monument is located in the town of Beurey-sur-Saulx.

== See also ==
- Communes of the Meuse department
- Massacre de la vallée de la Saulx
- Account of events at Couvonges, 29 August 1944. (in French)
- Photos of the memorial with a list of the victims' names.
