= Robert-Espagne =

- Commune
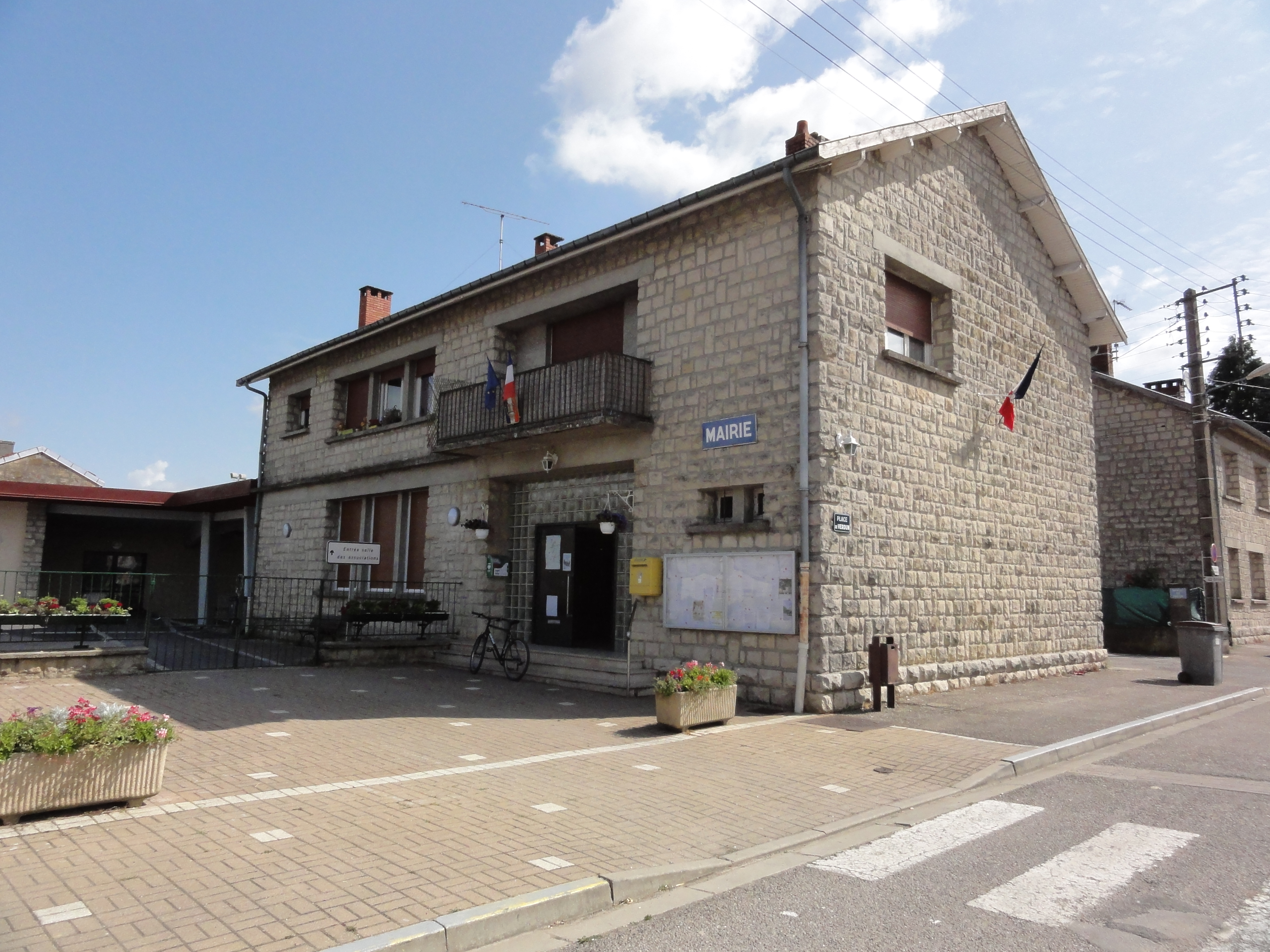
- The town hall in Robert-Espagne

- Coat of arms
- Location of Robert-Espagne
- Location within France Location within Grand Est
- Coordinates: 48°44′41″N 5°01′59″E
- Country: France
- Region: Grand Est
- Department: Meuse
- Arrondissement: Bar-le-Duc
- Canton: Revigny-sur-Ornain
- Intercommunality: CA Bar-le-Duc - Sud Meuse

Government
  - Mayor (2020–2026): Luc Fleurant
- Area^{1}: 7.33 km^{2} (2.83 sq mi)
- Highest elevation: 233 m (764 ft)
- Lowest elevation: 155 m (509 ft)
- Population (2023): 756
  - Density: 103/km^{2} (267/sq mi)
- Time zone: UTC+01:00 (CET)
  - Summer (DST): UTC+02:00 (CEST)
- INSEE/Postal code: 55435 /55000
- ^{1} French Land Register data, which excludes lakes, ponds, glaciers > 1 km^{2} (0.386 sq mi or 247 acres) and river estuaries.

Robert-Espagne is a commune in the Meuse department in Grand Est in north-eastern France.

On 29 August 1944, the 3rd Panzergenadier Division of the German Wehrmacht massacred 86 inhabitants of this and the three neighboring villages of Beurey-sur-Saulx, Couvonges and Mognéville. This is also referred to as the Massacre de la vallée de la Saulx.

== See also ==
- Communes of the Meuse department
