= Canton of Revigny-sur-Ornain =

Coordinates: 48.83°N 4.99°E

The canton of Revigny-sur-Ornain is an administrative division of the Meuse department, northeastern France. Its borders were modified at the French canton reorganisation which came into effect in March 2015. Its seat is in Revigny-sur-Ornain.

It consists of the following communes:

1. Andernay
2. Beurey-sur-Saulx
3. Brabant-le-Roi
4. Chaumont-sur-Aire
5. Contrisson
6. Courcelles-sur-Aire
7. Couvonges
8. Érize-la-Petite
9. Les Hauts-de-Chée
10. Laheycourt
11. Laimont
12. Lisle-en-Barrois
13. Louppy-le-Château
14. Mognéville
15. Nettancourt
16. Neuville-sur-Ornain
17. Noyers-Auzécourt
18. Rancourt-sur-Ornain
19. Rembercourt-Sommaisne
20. Remennecourt
21. Revigny-sur-Ornain
22. Robert-Espagne
23. Sommeilles
24. Val-d'Ornain
25. Vassincourt
26. Vaubecourt
27. Villers-aux-Vents
28. Villotte-devant-Louppy
