= Vaubecourt =

- Commune
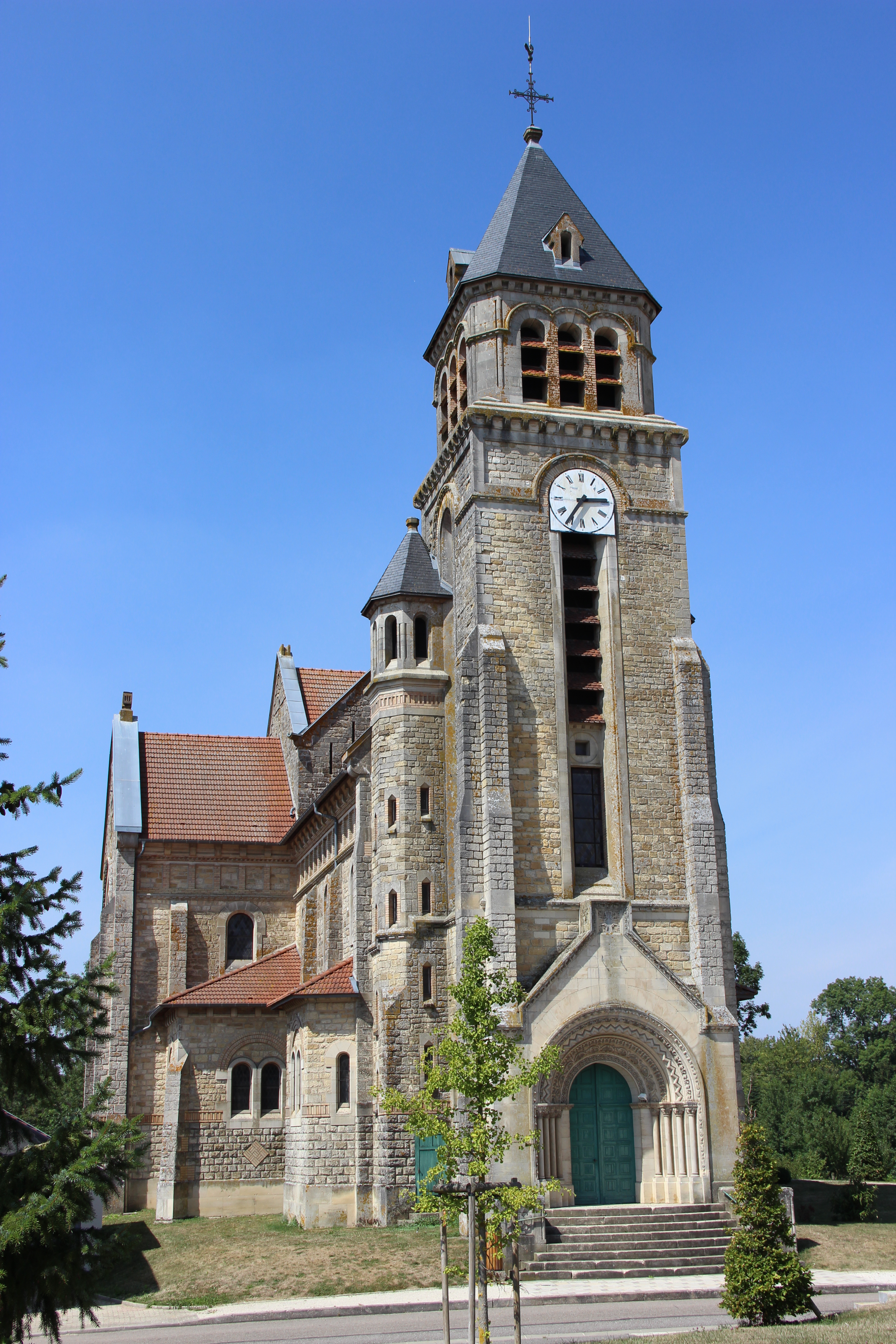
- The church in Vaubecourt

- Coat of arms
- Location of Vaubecourt
- Location within France Location within Grand Est
- Coordinates: 48°56′06″N 5°06′47″E
- Country: France
- Region: Grand Est
- Department: Meuse
- Arrondissement: Bar-le-Duc
- Canton: Revigny-sur-Ornain
- Intercommunality: CC de l'Aire à l'Argonne

Government
  - Mayor (2020–2026): Martine Aubry
- Area^{1}: 22.62 km^{2} (8.73 sq mi)
- Elevation: 201 m (659 ft)
- Highest elevation: 263 m (863 ft)
- Lowest elevation: 169 m (554 ft)
- Population (2023): 312
  - Density: 13.8/km^{2} (35.7/sq mi)
- Time zone: UTC+01:00 (CET)
  - Summer (DST): UTC+02:00 (CEST)
- INSEE/Postal code: 55532 /55250
- ^{1} French Land Register data, which excludes lakes, ponds, glaciers > 1 km^{2} (0.386 sq mi or 247 acres) and river estuaries.

Vaubecourt (French pronunciation: [vobkuʁ]) is a commune in the Meuse department in Grand Est in north-western France.

== See also ==
- Communes of the Meuse department
