= Les Hauts-de-Chée =

- Commune
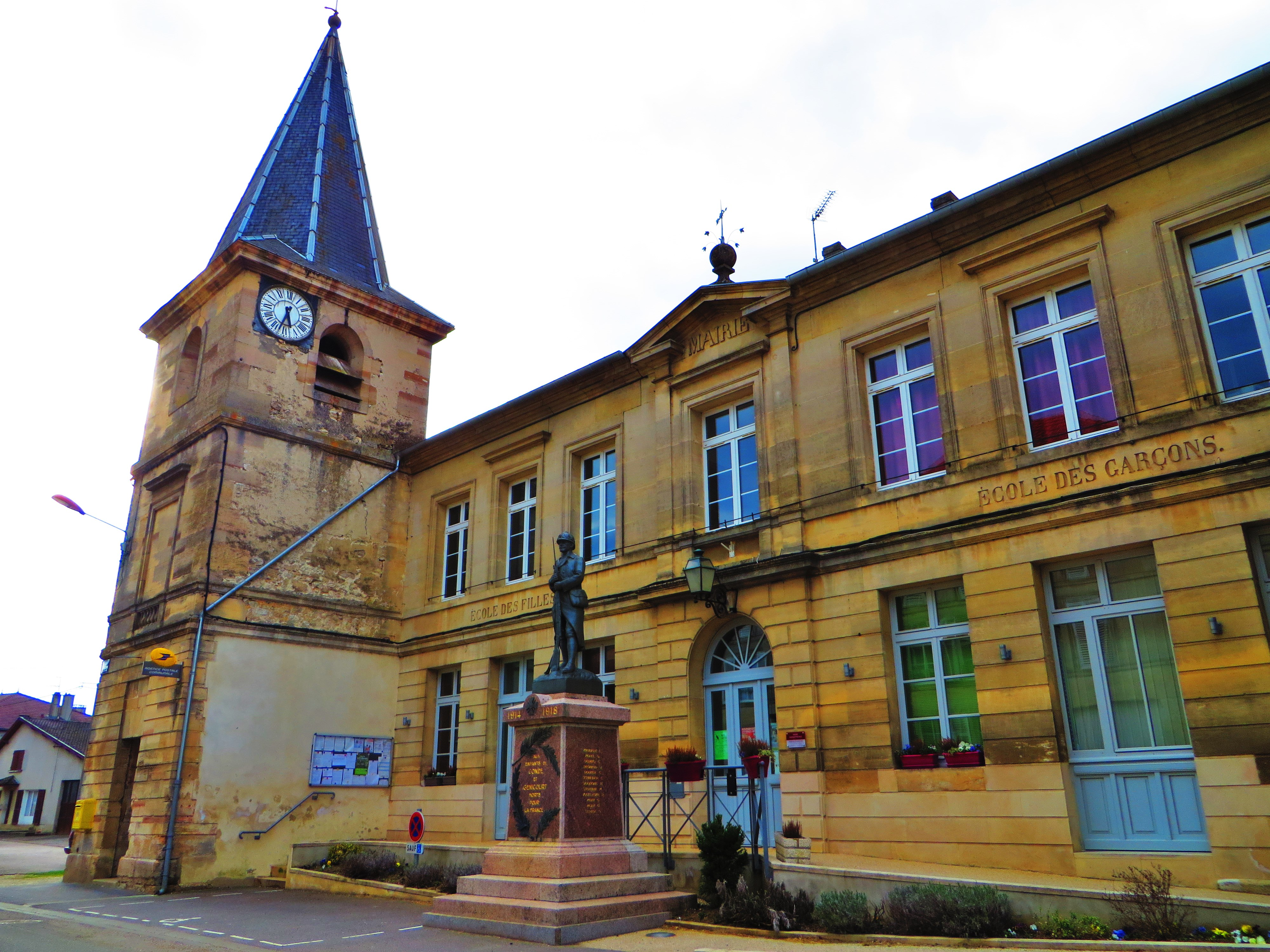
- The town hall in Les Hauts-de-Chée

- Coat of arms
- Location of Les Hauts-de-Chée
- Location within France Location within Grand Est
- Coordinates: 48°52′05″N 5°10′03″E
- Country: France
- Region: Grand Est
- Department: Meuse
- Arrondissement: Bar-le-Duc
- Canton: Revigny-sur-Ornain
- Intercommunality: CC de l'Aire à l'Argonne

Government
  - Mayor (2020–2026): Dania Klein
- Area^{1}: 50.17 km^{2} (19.37 sq mi)
- Elevation: 213 m (699 ft)
- Highest elevation: 301 m (988 ft)
- Lowest elevation: 184 m (604 ft)
- Population (2023): 693
  - Density: 13.8/km^{2} (35.8/sq mi)
- Time zone: UTC+01:00 (CET)
  - Summer (DST): UTC+02:00 (CEST)
- INSEE/Postal code: 55123 /55000
- ^{1} French Land Register data, which excludes lakes, ponds, glaciers > 1 km^{2} (0.386 sq mi or 247 acres) and river estuaries.

Les Hauts-de-Chée (French pronunciation: [le o də ʃe]) is a commune in the Meuse department in Grand Est in north-eastern France.

The former towns of Génicourt-sous-Condé, Hargeville-sur-Chée, Louppy-sur-Chée (Loppy-le-Petit) and Les Marats (Marat-la-Grande, Marat-la-Petite) were joined to Condé-en-Barrois on 20 June 1972, which subsequently changed its name to Les Hauts-de-Chée on 1 July 1972.

== Geography ==
The river Chée rises in the eastern part of the commune, then flows westward through the middle of the commune, crossing through several villages and hamlets.

== Climate ==
On average, Les Hauts-de-Chée experiences 49.0 days per year with a minimum temperature below 0 °C (32.0 °F), 1.5 days per year with a minimum temperature below −10 °C (14.0 °F), 7.8 days per year with a maximum temperature below 0 °C (32.0 °F), and 13.6 days per year with a maximum temperature above 30 °C (86.0 °F). The record high temperature was 39.6 °C (103.3 °F) on July 25, 2019, while the record low temperature was −15.2 °C (4.6 °F) on December 20, 2009.

Climate data for Les Hauts-de-Chée (1991–2020 normals, extremes 2009–present)
Month	Jan	Feb	Mar	Apr	May	Jun	Jul	Aug	Sep	Oct	Nov	Dec	Year
Record high °C (°F)	15.3 (59.5)	21.6 (70.9)	25.8 (78.4)	27.7 (81.9)	32.8 (91.0)	36.0 (96.8)	39.6 (103.3)	37.5 (99.5)	34.1 (93.4)	28.1 (82.6)	22.6 (72.7)	17.0 (62.6)	39.6 (103.3)
Mean daily maximum °C (°F)	5.3 (41.5)	6.7 (44.1)	11.5 (52.7)	16.4 (61.5)	19.1 (66.4)	23.0 (73.4)	25.6 (78.1)	25.2 (77.4)	21.2 (70.2)	15.5 (59.9)	10.0 (50.0)	6.6 (43.9)	15.5 (59.9)
Daily mean °C (°F)	3.1 (37.6)	3.7 (38.7)	7.2 (45.0)	11.0 (51.8)	13.8 (56.8)	17.5 (63.5)	19.9 (67.8)	19.7 (67.5)	16.0 (60.8)	11.8 (53.2)	7.3 (45.1)	4.3 (39.7)	11.3 (52.3)
Mean daily minimum °C (°F)	0.8 (33.4)	0.7 (33.3)	2.9 (37.2)	5.7 (42.3)	8.4 (47.1)	11.9 (53.4)	14.2 (57.6)	14.2 (57.6)	10.9 (51.6)	8.1 (46.6)	4.7 (40.5)	1.9 (35.4)	7.0 (44.7)
Record low °C (°F)	−10.0 (14.0)	−14.7 (5.5)	−8.7 (16.3)	−4.7 (23.5)	−1.4 (29.5)	2.2 (36.0)	6.4 (43.5)	5.0 (41.0)	2.1 (35.8)	−4.0 (24.8)	−7.7 (18.1)	−15.2 (4.6)	−15.2 (4.6)
Average precipitation mm (inches)	89.9 (3.54)	70.3 (2.77)	64.3 (2.53)	48.3 (1.90)	79.4 (3.13)	66.3 (2.61)	68.0 (2.68)	69.6 (2.74)	66.3 (2.61)	77.7 (3.06)	81.6 (3.21)	106.8 (4.20)	888.5 (34.98)
Average precipitation days (≥ 1.0 mm)	15.1	12.1	9.6	7.4	11.7	10.0	8.5	8.2	7.5	10.9	12.8	15.4	129.2
Source: Meteociel

== See also ==
- Communes of the Meuse department
