= Laheycourt =

- Commune
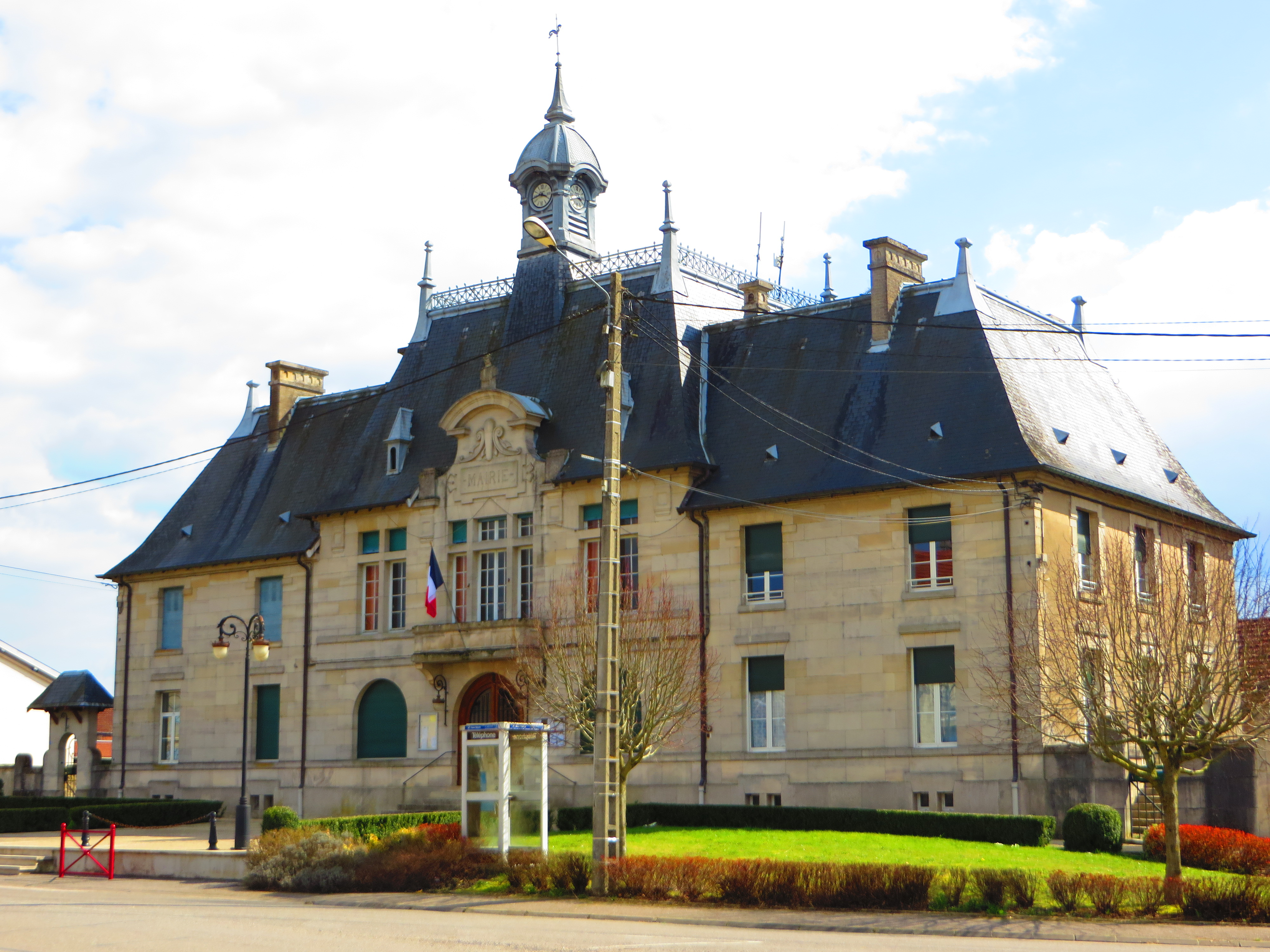
- The town hall in Laheycourt

- Coat of arms
- Location of Laheycourt
- Location within France Location within Grand Est
- Coordinates: 48°53′30″N 5°01′25″E
- Country: France
- Region: Grand Est
- Department: Meuse
- Arrondissement: Bar-le-Duc
- Canton: Revigny-sur-Ornain
- Intercommunality: CC du Pays de Revigny-sur-Ornain

Government
  - Mayor (2020–2026): Jean-Jacques Westrich
- Area^{1}: 18 km^{2} (6.9 sq mi)
- Elevation: 170 m (560 ft)
- Highest elevation: 204 m (669 ft)
- Lowest elevation: 156 m (512 ft)
- Population (2023): 349
  - Density: 19/km^{2} (50/sq mi)
- Time zone: UTC+01:00 (CET)
  - Summer (DST): UTC+02:00 (CEST)
- INSEE/Postal code: 55271 /55800
- ^{1} French Land Register data, which excludes lakes, ponds, glaciers > 1 km^{2} (0.386 sq mi or 247 acres) and river estuaries.

Laheycourt (French pronunciation: [la.ekuʁ]) is a commune in the Meuse department in Grand Est in north-eastern France.

== Geography ==
The Chée flows westward through the southern part of the commune and crosses the village.

== See also ==
- Communes of the Meuse department
