= Rembercourt-Sommaisne =

- Commune
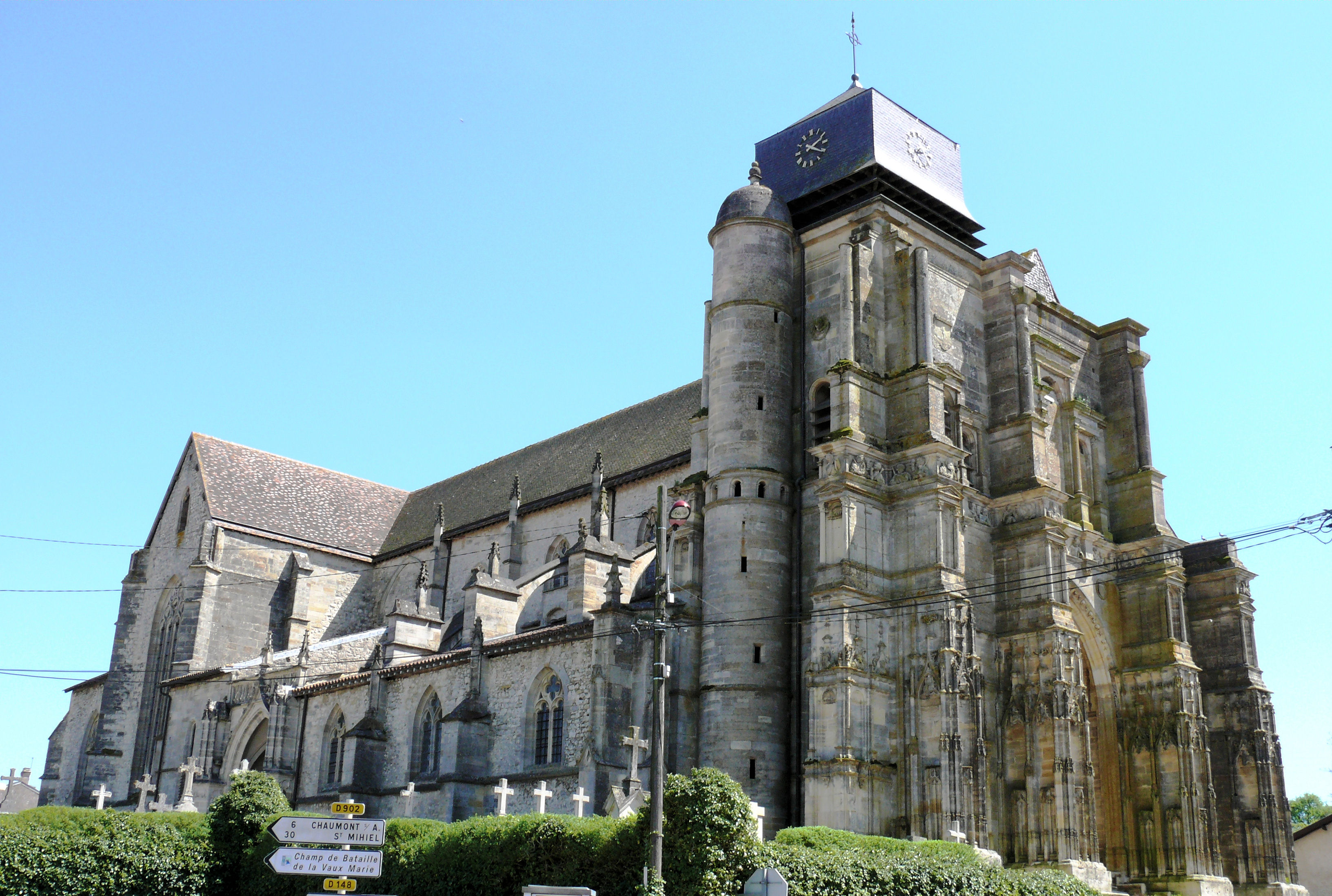
- Saint-Louvent church

- Coat of arms
- Location of Rembercourt-Sommaisne
- Location within France Location within Grand Est
- Coordinates: 48°54′40″N 5°10′44″E
- Country: France
- Region: Grand Est
- Department: Meuse
- Arrondissement: Bar-le-Duc
- Canton: Revigny-sur-Ornain
- Intercommunality: CC de l'Aire à l'Argonne

Government
  - Mayor (2020–2026): Sylvain Obara
- Area^{1}: 22.32 km^{2} (8.62 sq mi)
- Highest elevation: 307 m (1,007 ft)
- Lowest elevation: 223 m (732 ft)
- Population (2023): 309
  - Density: 13.8/km^{2} (35.9/sq mi)
- Time zone: UTC+01:00 (CET)
  - Summer (DST): UTC+02:00 (CEST)
- INSEE/Postal code: 55423 /55250
- ^{1} French Land Register data, which excludes lakes, ponds, glaciers > 1 km^{2} (0.386 sq mi or 247 acres) and river estuaries.

Rembercourt-Sommaisne (French pronunciation: [ʁɑ̃bɛʁkuʁ sɔmɛn]) is a commune in the Meuse department in Grand Est in northeastern France.

Rembercourt-Sommaisne was created on 1 January 1973 when the former communes of Rembercourt-aux-Pots and Sommaisne were joined. The 15th century church of Saint-Louvent in Rembercourt-aux-Pots is a listed monument.

== Geography ==
The Chée forms part of the commune's southern border.

The Aisne rises near Sommaisne, a hamlet in the northern part of the commune.

== See also ==
- Communes of the Meuse department
