= Villotte-devant-Louppy =

- Commune
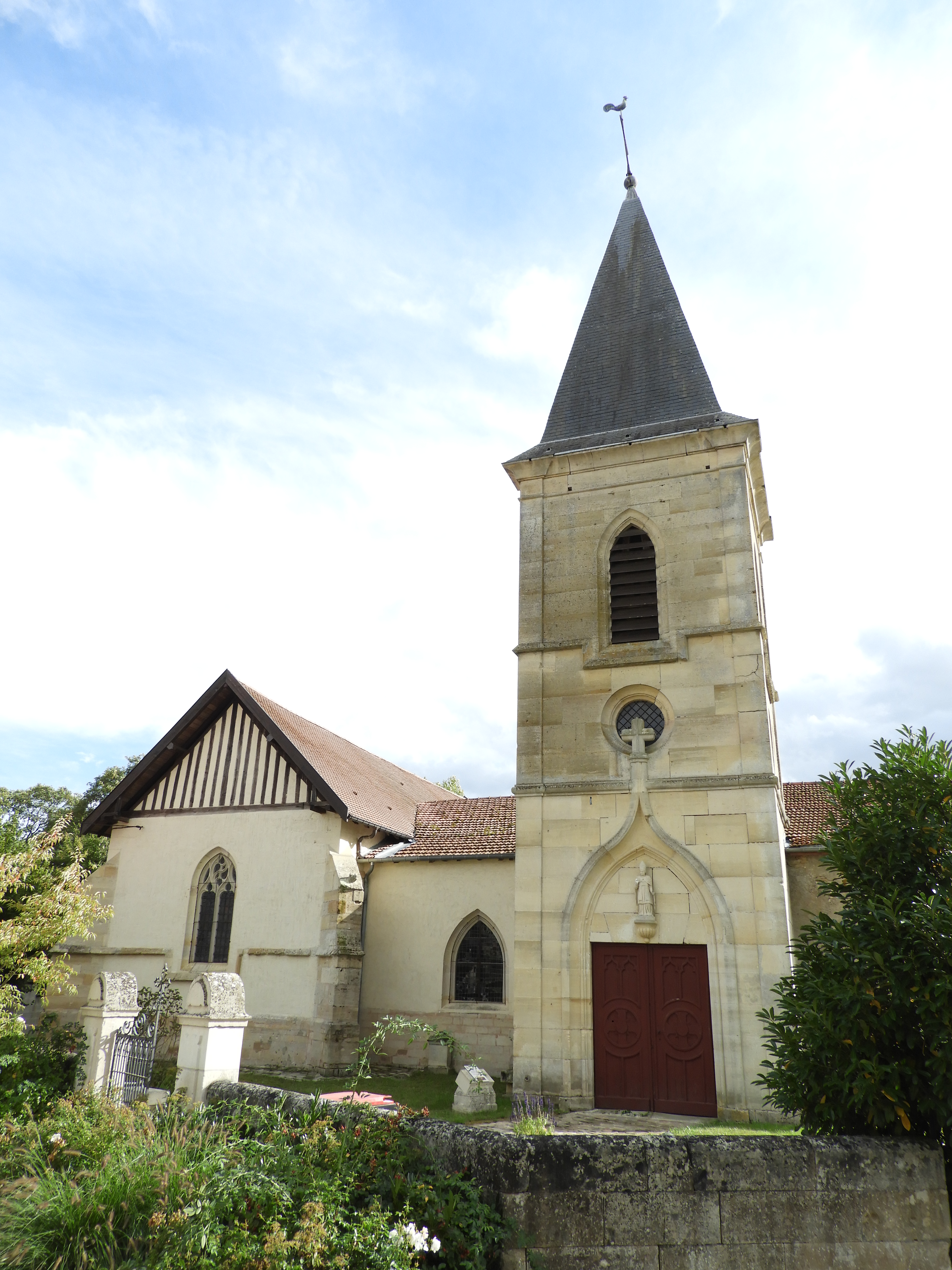
- The church in Villotte-devant-Louppy

- Coat of arms
- Location of Villotte-devant-Louppy
- Location within France Location within Grand Est
- Coordinates: 48°53′11″N 5°04′39″E
- Country: France
- Region: Grand Est
- Department: Meuse
- Arrondissement: Bar-le-Duc
- Canton: Revigny-sur-Ornain
- Intercommunality: CC de l'Aire à l'Argonne

Government
  - Mayor (2020–2026): Alain Chaudron
- Area^{1}: 11.23 km^{2} (4.34 sq mi)
- Elevation: 200 m (660 ft)
- Highest elevation: 232 m (761 ft)
- Lowest elevation: 165 m (541 ft)
- Population (2023): 163
  - Density: 14.5/km^{2} (37.6/sq mi)
- Time zone: UTC+01:00 (CET)
  - Summer (DST): UTC+02:00 (CEST)
- INSEE/Postal code: 55569 /55250
- ^{1} French Land Register data, which excludes lakes, ponds, glaciers > 1 km^{2} (0.386 sq mi or 247 acres) and river estuaries.

Villotte-devant-Louppy (French pronunciation: [vilɔt dəvɑ̃ lupi], literally Villotte before Louppy) is a commune in the Meuse department in Grand Est in north-eastern France.

== Geography ==
The village lies on the right bank of the Fluant, a stream tributary of the Chée, which forms part of the commune's southern border.

== See also ==
- Communes of the Meuse department
