= Heiltz-l'Évêque =

- Commune
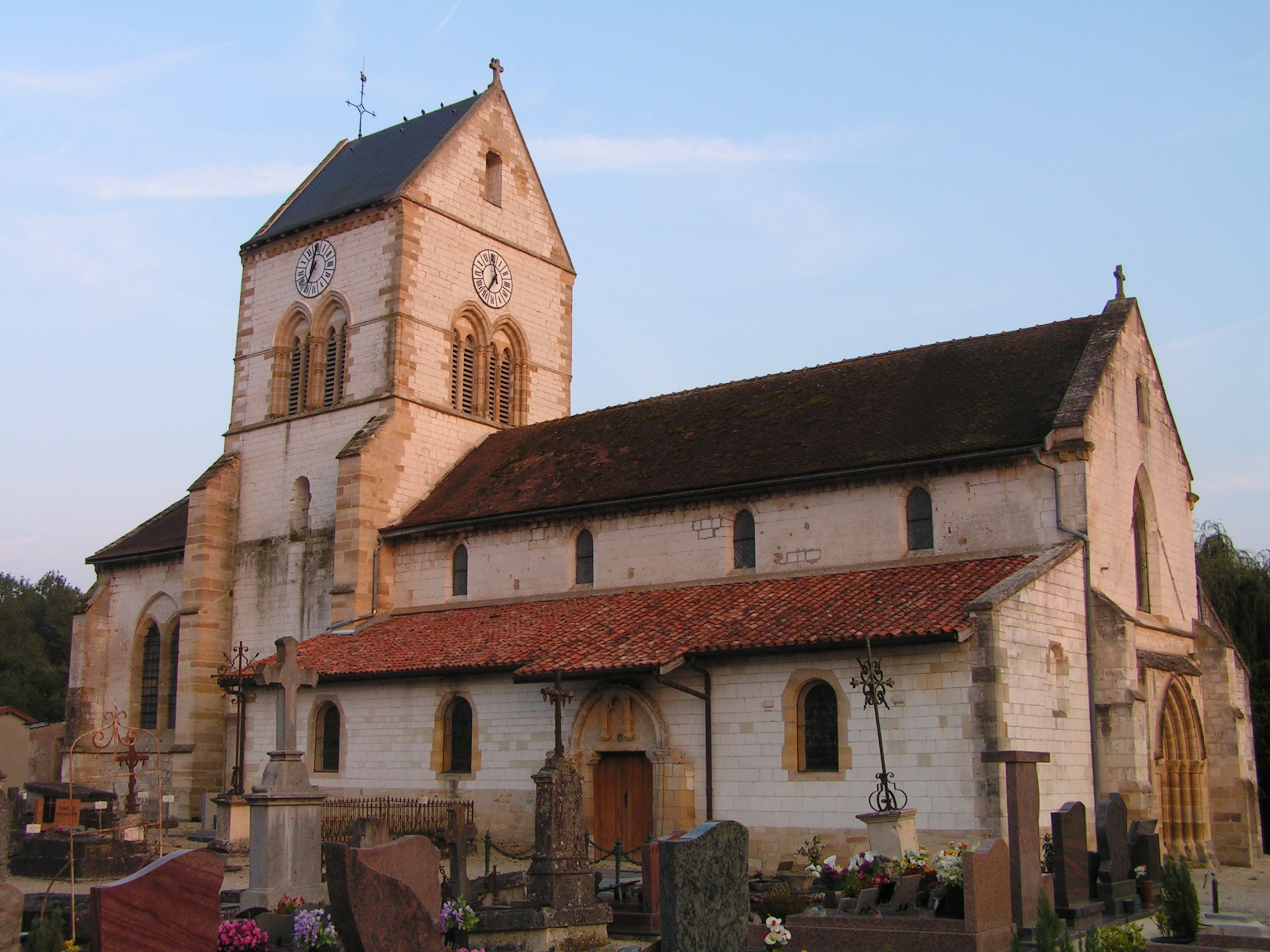
- The church in Heiltz-l'Évêque

- Coat of arms
- Location of Heiltz-l'Évêque
- Location within France Location within Grand Est
- Coordinates: 48°46′53″N 4°44′47″E
- Country: France
- Region: Grand Est
- Department: Marne
- Arrondissement: Vitry-le-François
- Canton: Sermaize-les-Bains
- Intercommunality: Côtes de Champagne et Val de Saulx

Government
  - Mayor (2020–2026): Michel Nicomette
- Area^{1}: 9.43 km^{2} (3.64 sq mi)
- Elevation: 110 m (360 ft)
- Population (2023): 276
  - Density: 29.3/km^{2} (75.8/sq mi)
- Time zone: UTC+01:00 (CET)
  - Summer (DST): UTC+02:00 (CEST)
- INSEE/Postal code: 51290 /51340
- ^{1} French Land Register data, which excludes lakes, ponds, glaciers > 1 km^{2} (0.386 sq mi or 247 acres) and river estuaries.

Heiltz-l'Évêque (French pronunciation: [ɛls levɛk]) is a commune in the Marne department in north-eastern France.

== Geography ==
The Chée flows west-southwestward through the middle of the commune and forms part of its south-western border.

== See also ==
- Communes of the Marne department
