= Changy, Marne =

Changy
- Commune
- Coat of arms
- Location of Changy
- Location within France Location within Grand Est
- Coordinates: 48°46′29″N 4°40′45″E
- Country: France
- Region: Grand Est
- Department: Marne
- Arrondissement: Vitry-le-François
- Canton: Sermaize-les-Bains

Government
  - Mayor (2020–2026): Jean-Marie Mougeot
- Area^{1}: 6.26 km^{2} (2.42 sq mi)
- Elevation: 148 m (486 ft)
- Population (2023): 116
  - Density: 18.5/km^{2} (48.0/sq mi)
- Time zone: UTC+01:00 (CET)
  - Summer (DST): UTC+02:00 (CEST)
- INSEE/Postal code: 51122 /51300
- ^{1} French Land Register data, which excludes lakes, ponds, glaciers > 1 km^{2} (0.386 sq mi or 247 acres) and river estuaries.

Changy (French pronunciation: [ʃɑ̃ʒi]) is a commune in the Marne department in north-eastern France.

== Geography ==
The village lies in the southern part of the commune, above the right bank of the Chée, which forms most of its south-eastern border.

== See also ==
- Communes of the Marne department
