= Noyers-Auzécourt =

- Commune
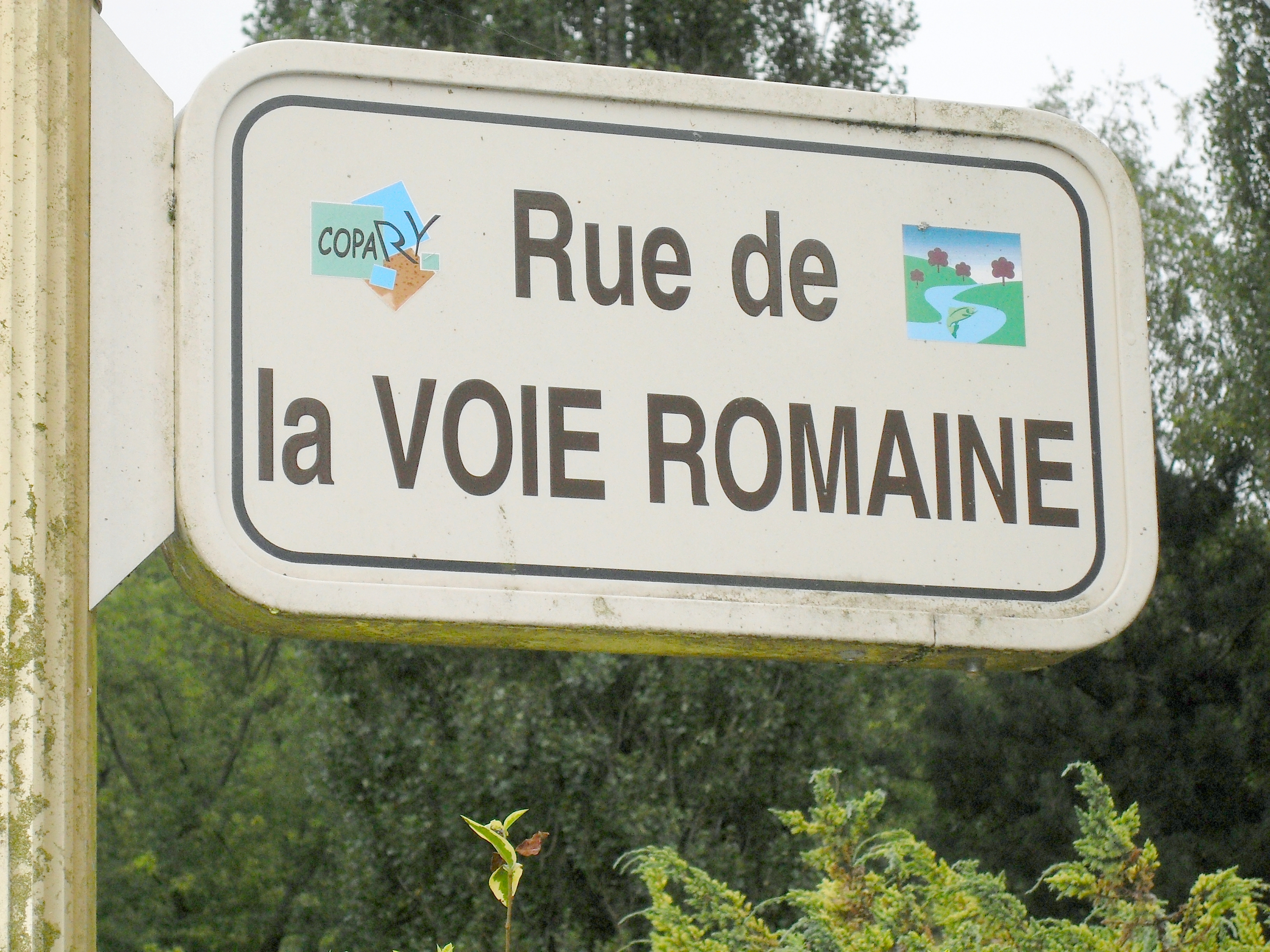
- Roman road at the hamlet of Maison du Val

- Coat of arms
- Location of Noyers-Auzécourt
- Location within France Location within Grand Est
- Coordinates: 48°53′07″N 4°58′22″E
- Country: France
- Region: Grand Est
- Department: Meuse
- Arrondissement: Bar-le-Duc
- Canton: Revigny-sur-Ornain
- Intercommunality: CC du pays de Revigny sur Ornain

Government
  - Mayor (2020–2026): Mathieu Kimenau
- Area^{1}: 17.22 km^{2} (6.65 sq mi)
- Elevation: 152 m (499 ft)
- Highest elevation: 191 m (627 ft)
- Lowest elevation: 140 m (460 ft)
- Population (2023): 273
  - Density: 15.9/km^{2} (41.1/sq mi)
- Time zone: UTC+01:00 (CET)
  - Summer (DST): UTC+02:00 (CEST)
- INSEE/Postal code: 55388 /55800
- ^{1} French Land Register data, which excludes lakes, ponds, glaciers > 1 km^{2} (0.386 sq mi or 247 acres) and river estuaries.

Noyers-Auzécourt (French pronunciation: [nwaje ozekuʁ]) is a commune in the Meuse department in Grand Est in north-eastern France.

== Geography ==
The Chée flows southwestward through the middle of the commune.

== See also ==
- Communes of the Meuse department
