= Ornain =

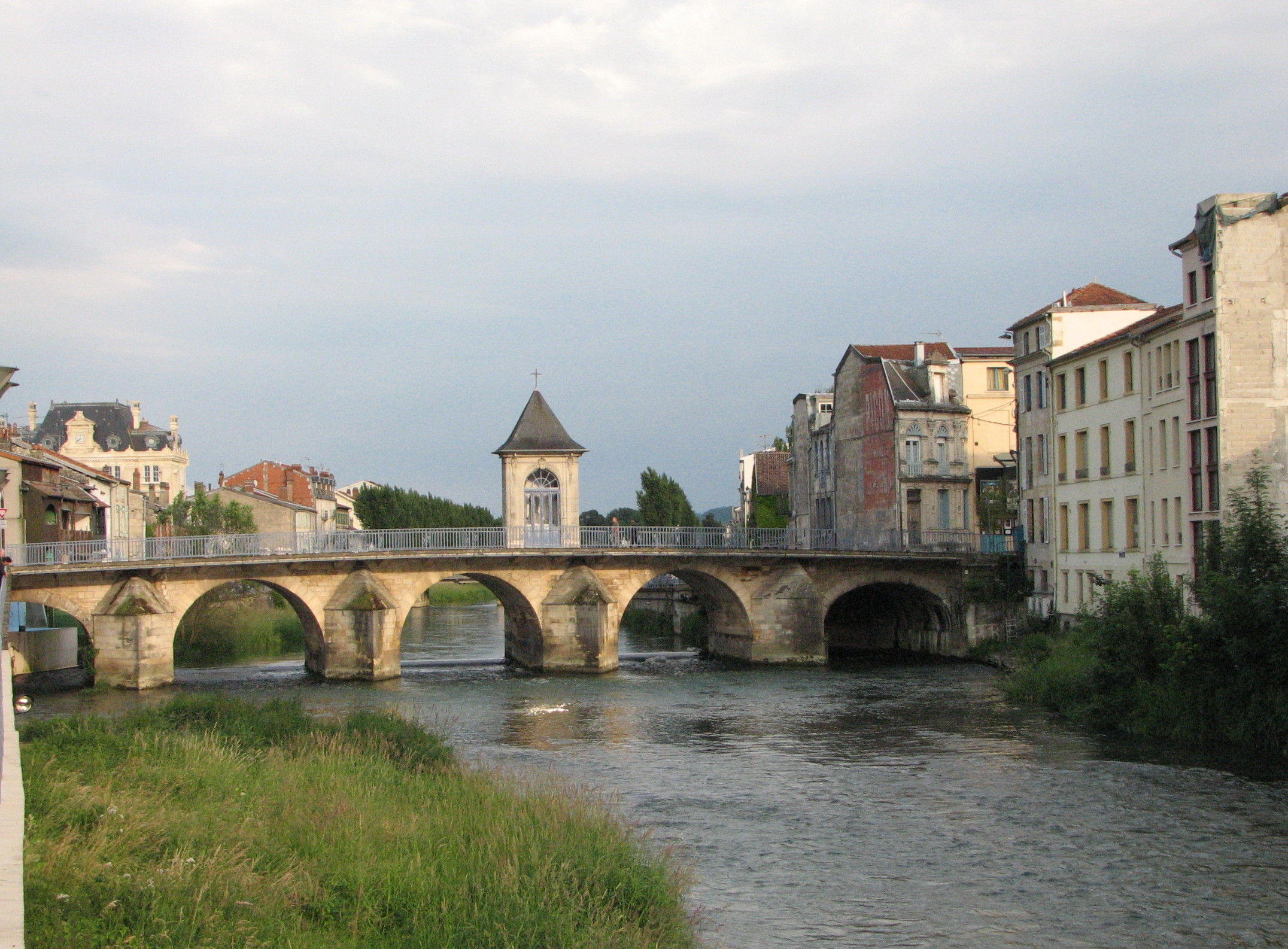
- Ornain flowing through Bar-le-Duc

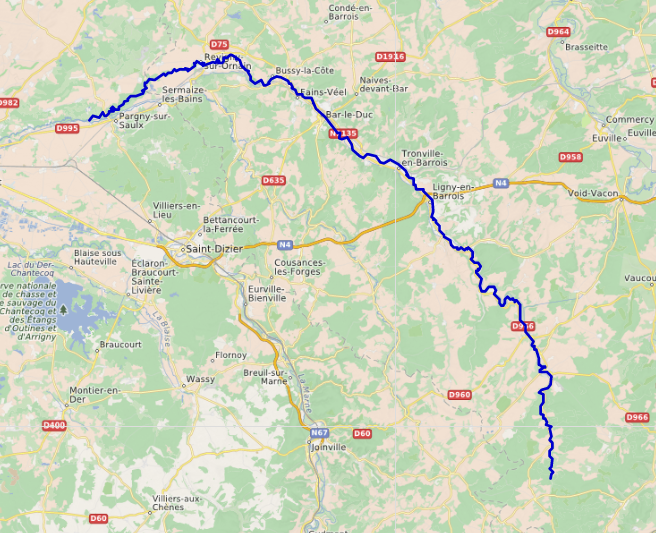

Location
- Country: France

Physical characteristics
- Mouth
  - location: Saulx
  - coordinates: 48°46′7″N 4°48′15″E
- Length: 116 km (72 mi)

Basin features
- Progression: Saulx→ Marne→ Seine→ English Channel

The Ornain (French pronunciation: [ɔʁnɛ̃]) is a 116 km long river in northeastern France, right tributary of the Saulx (Seine basin). It is formed near the village Gondrecourt-le-Château by the confluence of the small rivers Ognon and Maldite. It flows generally northwest. Its course crosses the following départements and towns:

- Meuse: Gondrecourt-le-Château, Ligny-en-Barrois, Bar-le-Duc, Revigny-sur-Ornain
- Marne

The Ornain flows into the Saulx in Pargny-sur-Saulx. The part of the Marne-Rhine Canal between Demange-aux-Eaux and Sermaize-les-Bains runs parallel to the Ornain.
