= Sommeilles =

- Commune
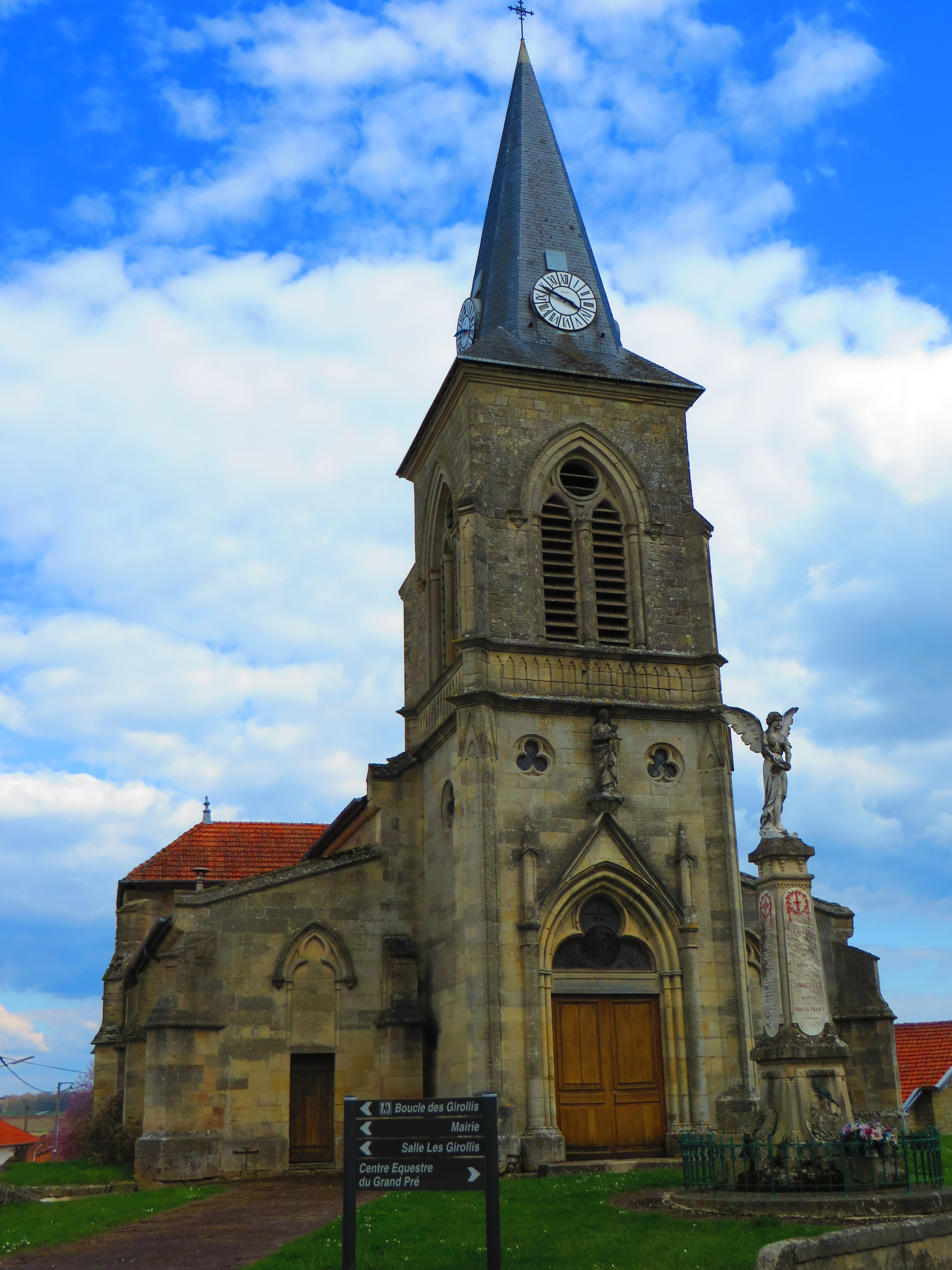
- The church in Sommeilles

- Coat of arms
- Location of Sommeilles
- Location within France Location within Grand Est
- Coordinates: 48°54′11″N 4°57′12″E
- Country: France
- Region: Grand Est
- Department: Meuse
- Arrondissement: Bar-le-Duc
- Canton: Revigny-sur-Ornain
- Intercommunality: CC du pays de Revigny sur Ornain

Government
  - Mayor (2020–2026): Alain Aimond
- Area^{1}: 18.81 km^{2} (7.26 sq mi)
- Elevation: 180 m (590 ft)
- Highest elevation: 193 m (633 ft)
- Lowest elevation: 150 m (490 ft)
- Population (2023): 181
  - Density: 9.62/km^{2} (24.9/sq mi)
- Time zone: UTC+01:00 (CET)
  - Summer (DST): UTC+02:00 (CEST)
- INSEE/Postal code: 55493 /55800
- ^{1} French Land Register data, which excludes lakes, ponds, glaciers > 1 km^{2} (0.386 sq mi or 247 acres) and river estuaries.

Sommeilles (French pronunciation: [sɔmɛj]) is a commune in the Meuse department in Grand Est in north-eastern France.

== See also ==
- Communes of the Meuse department
