= Saulx (river) =

River in France

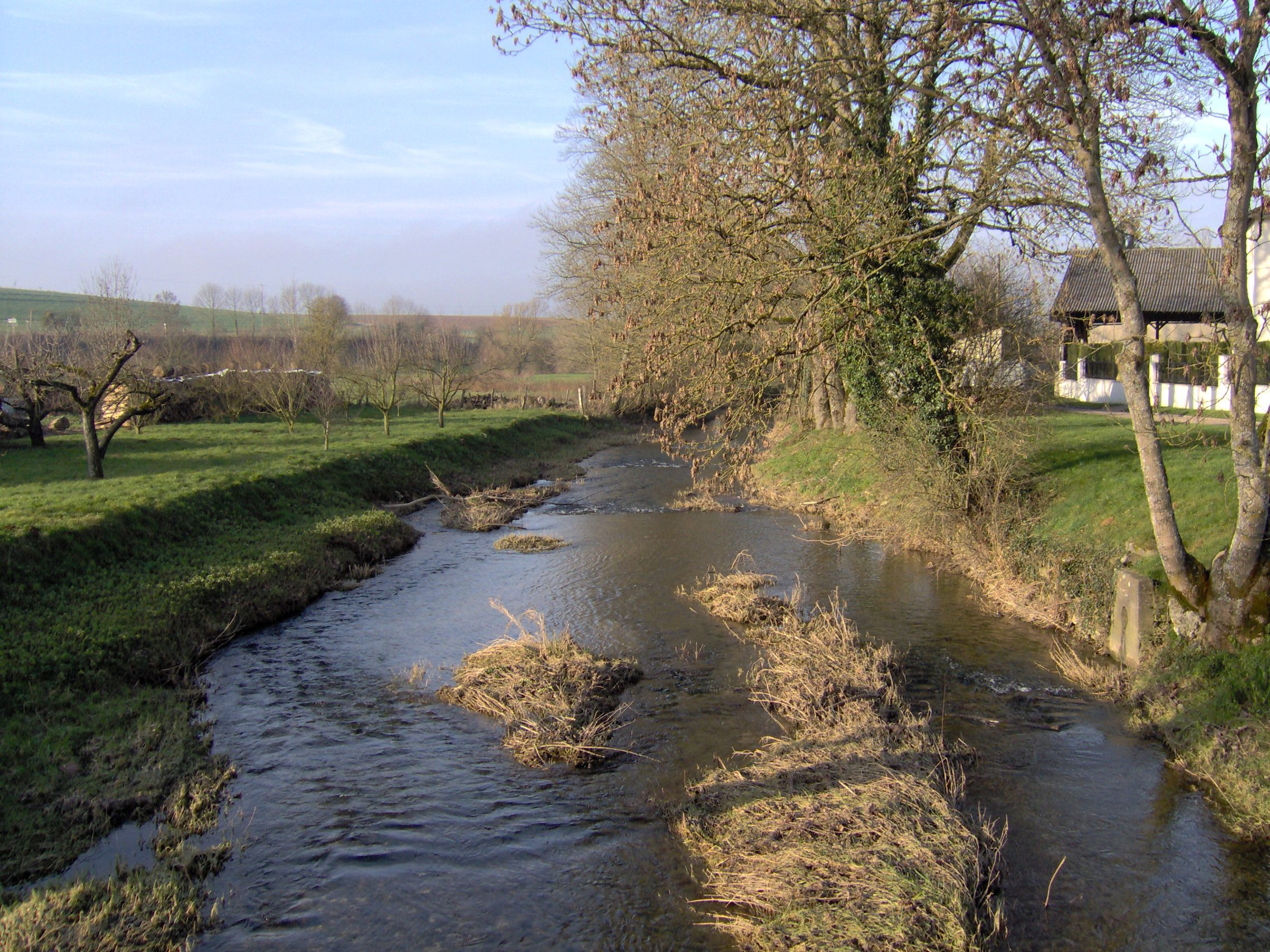

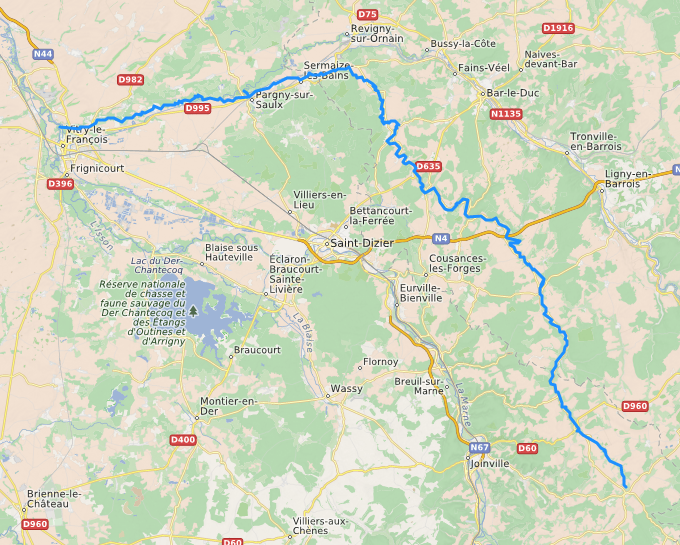

Location
- Country: France

Physical characteristics
- Mouth
  - location: Marne
  - coordinates: 48°44′34″N 4°34′54″E
- Length: 115 km (71 mi)

Basin features
- Progression: Marne→ Seine→ English Channel

The Saulx (French pronunciation: [so]) is a 115 km long river in France, right tributary of the Marne. Its source is near the village Germisay. It flows generally northwest, through the following départements and towns:

- Haute-Marne: Effincourt
- Meuse: Montiers-sur-Saulx, Stainville
- Marne: Sermaize-les-Bains, Pargny-sur-Saulx, Vitry-le-François

The Saulx flows into the Marne in Vitry-le-François. Its main tributaries are the Ornain and the Chée. The part of the Marne-Rhine Canal between Vitry-le-François and Sermaize-les-Bains runs parallel to the Saulx.
