= Vauciennes =

Vauciennes may refer to the following places in France:

- Vauciennes, Marne, a commune in the Marne department
- Vauciennes, Oise, a commune in the Oise department
