= Verneuil, Marne =

Verneuil
- Commune
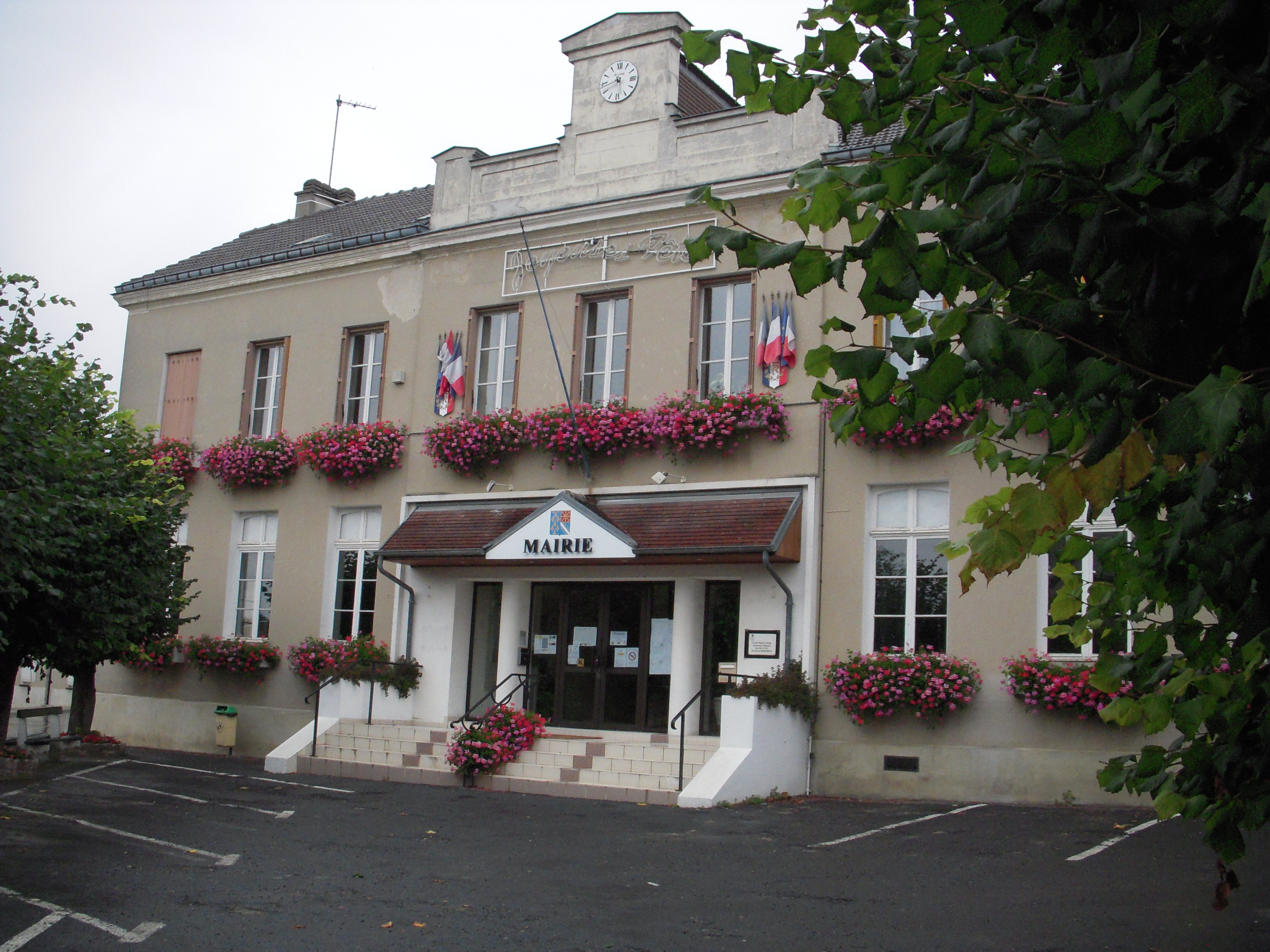
- The town hall in Verneuil

- Coat of arms
- Location of Verneuil
- Location within France Location within Grand Est
- Coordinates: 49°06′02″N 3°40′25″E
- Country: France
- Region: Grand Est
- Department: Marne
- Arrondissement: Épernay
- Canton: Dormans-Paysages de Champagne

Government
  - Mayor (2020–2026): Sylvie Guenet-Nansot
- Area^{1}: 13.14 km^{2} (5.07 sq mi)
- Elevation: 67 m (220 ft)
- Population (2023): 836
  - Density: 63.6/km^{2} (165/sq mi)
- Time zone: UTC+01:00 (CET)
  - Summer (DST): UTC+02:00 (CEST)
- INSEE/Postal code: 51609 /51700
- ^{1} French Land Register data, which excludes lakes, ponds, glaciers > 1 km^{2} (0.386 sq mi or 247 acres) and river estuaries.

Verneuil (French pronunciation: [vɛʁnœj]) is a commune in the Marne department in north-eastern France.

== See also ==
- Communes of the Marne department
