= Le Baizil =

- Commune
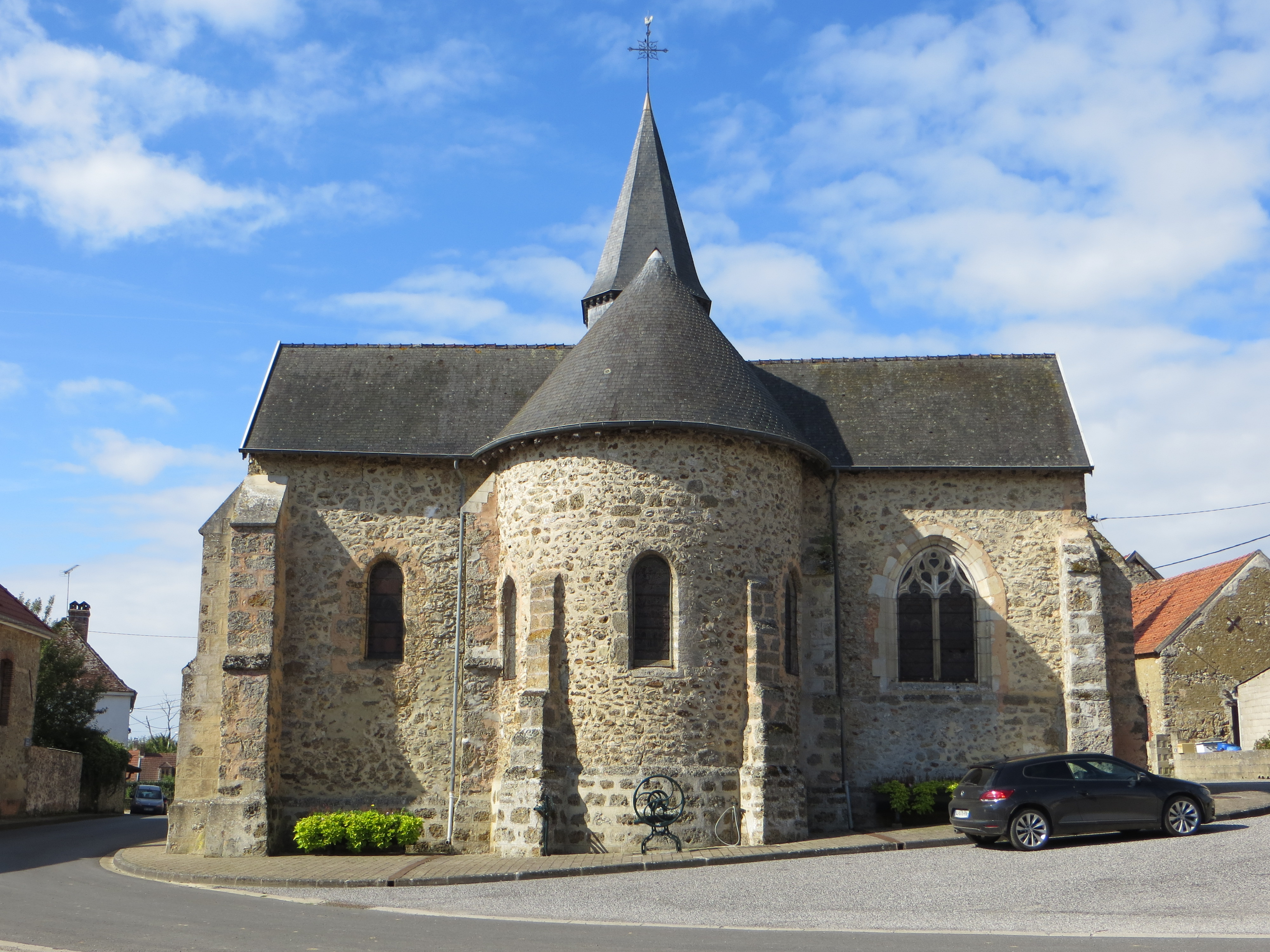
- The church in Le Baizil
- Location of Le Baizil
- Location within France Location within Grand Est
- Coordinates: 48°58′12″N 3°47′39″E
- Country: France
- Region: Grand Est
- Department: Marne
- Arrondissement: Épernay
- Canton: Dormans-Paysages de Champagne

Government
  - Mayor (2020–2026): Christine Meteyer
- Area^{1}: 14.49 km^{2} (5.59 sq mi)
- Elevation: 173 m (568 ft)
- Population (2023): 282
  - Density: 19.5/km^{2} (50.4/sq mi)
- Time zone: UTC+01:00 (CET)
  - Summer (DST): UTC+02:00 (CEST)
- INSEE/Postal code: 51033 /51270
- ^{1} French Land Register data, which excludes lakes, ponds, glaciers > 1 km^{2} (0.386 sq mi or 247 acres) and river estuaries.

Le Baizil (French pronunciation: [lə bɛzil]) is a commune in the Marne department in northeastern France.

== Population ==
Historical population
| Year | Pop. | ±% p.a. |
|---|---|---|
| 1968 | 344 | — |
| 1975 | 289 | −2.46% |
| 1982 | 257 | −1.66% |
| 1990 | 255 | −0.10% |
| 1999 | 262 | +0.30% |
| 2007 | 258 | −0.19% |
| 2012 | 258 | +0.00% |
| 2017 | 253 | −0.39% |
| 2023 | 282 | +1.83% |
Source: INSEE

== See also ==
- Communes of the Marne department
