= Romigny =

- Commune
- Location of Romigny
- Location within France Location within Grand Est
- Coordinates: 49°10′23″N 3°46′11″E
- Country: France
- Region: Grand Est
- Department: Marne
- Arrondissement: Reims
- Canton: Dormans-Paysages de Champagne
- Intercommunality: CU Grand Reims

Government
  - Mayor (2020–2026): Bruno Cochemé
- Area^{1}: 11.35 km^{2} (4.38 sq mi)
- Elevation: 216 m (709 ft)
- Population (2023): 206
  - Density: 18.1/km^{2} (47.0/sq mi)
- Time zone: UTC+01:00 (CET)
  - Summer (DST): UTC+02:00 (CEST)
- INSEE/Postal code: 51466 /51170
- ^{1} French Land Register data, which excludes lakes, ponds, glaciers > 1 km^{2} (0.386 sq mi or 247 acres) and river estuaries.

Romigny (French pronunciation: [ʁɔmiɲi]) is a commune in the Marne department in north-eastern France.

== See also ==
- Communes of the Marne department
