= Passy-Grigny =

- Commune
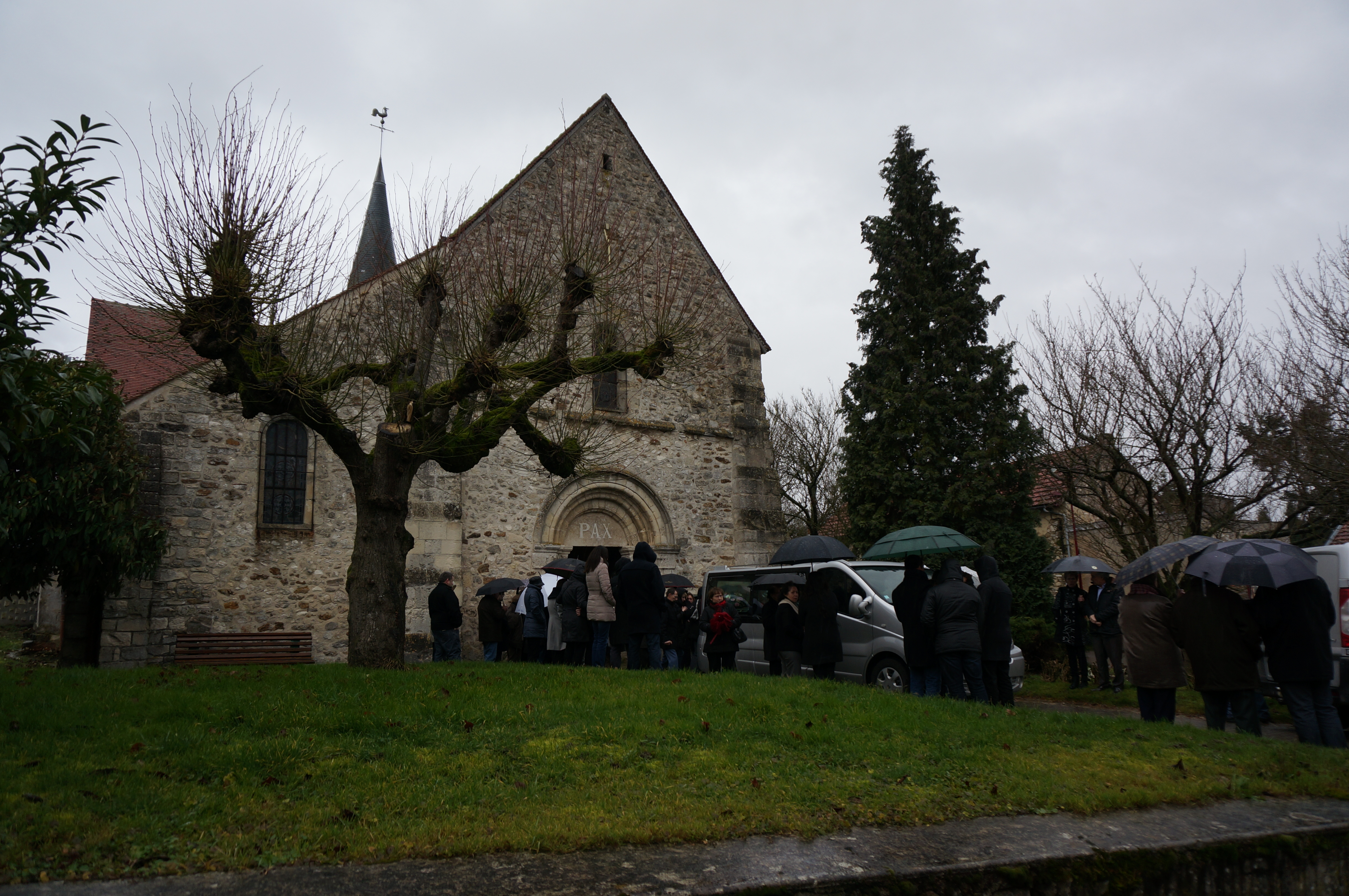
- The church in Passy-Grigny

- Coat of arms
- Location of Passy-Grigny
- Location within France Location within Grand Est
- Coordinates: 49°07′37″N 3°40′45″E
- Country: France
- Region: Grand Est
- Department: Marne
- Arrondissement: Épernay
- Canton: Dormans-Paysages de Champagne
- Intercommunality: Paysages de la Champagne

Government
  - Mayor (2020–2026): Fabrice Hubert
- Area^{1}: 11.99 km^{2} (4.63 sq mi)
- Elevation: 104 m (341 ft)
- Population (2023): 370
  - Density: 31/km^{2} (80/sq mi)
- Time zone: UTC+01:00 (CET)
  - Summer (DST): UTC+02:00 (CEST)
- INSEE/Postal code: 51425 /51700
- ^{1} French Land Register data, which excludes lakes, ponds, glaciers > 1 km^{2} (0.386 sq mi or 247 acres) and river estuaries.

Passy-Grigny (French pronunciation: [pasi ɡʁiɲi]) is a commune in the Marne department in north-eastern France.

== Geography ==
Passy-Grigny is located in the west of the Marne department , in the Grand Est region, on the border with the Aisne department and the Hauts-de-France region.

The commune of Passy-Grigny covers 1,199 hectares.

It belongs to the agricultural region of Tardenois.

== Climate ==
In 2010, the climate of the commune was of the degraded oceanic climate type of the Central and Northern plains, according to a study by the National Center for Scientific Research based on a series of data covering the period 1971-2000. In 2020, Météo-France published a typology of the climates of metropolitan France in which the commune is exposed to an altered oceanic climate and is in the Northeast climatic region of the Paris basin, characterized by poor sunshine, average rainfall regularly distributed throughout the year and a cold winter ( 3 °C).

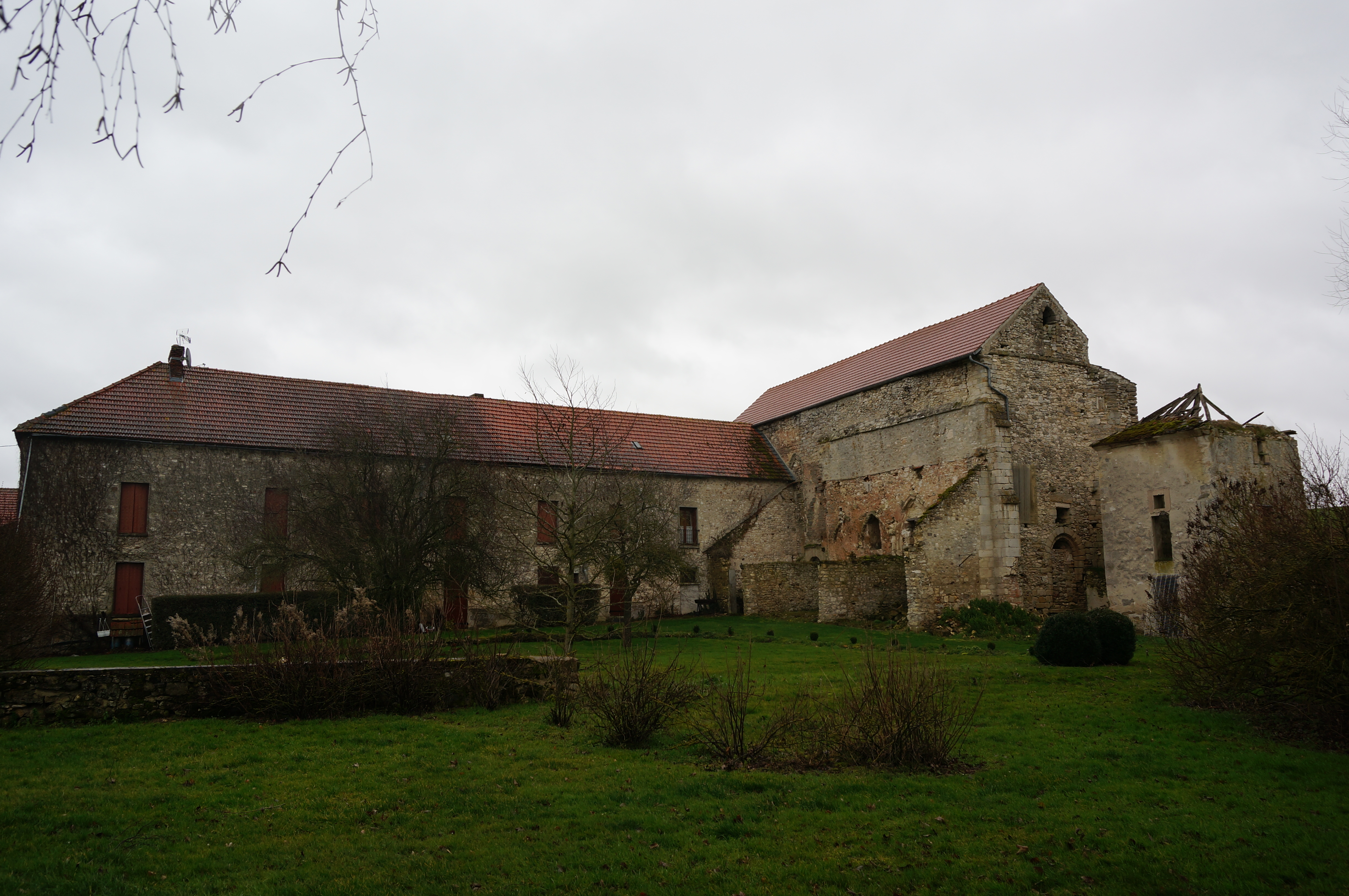
Commandry of Passy-Grigny.

== See also ==
- Communes of the Marne department
