= Leuvrigny =

- Commune
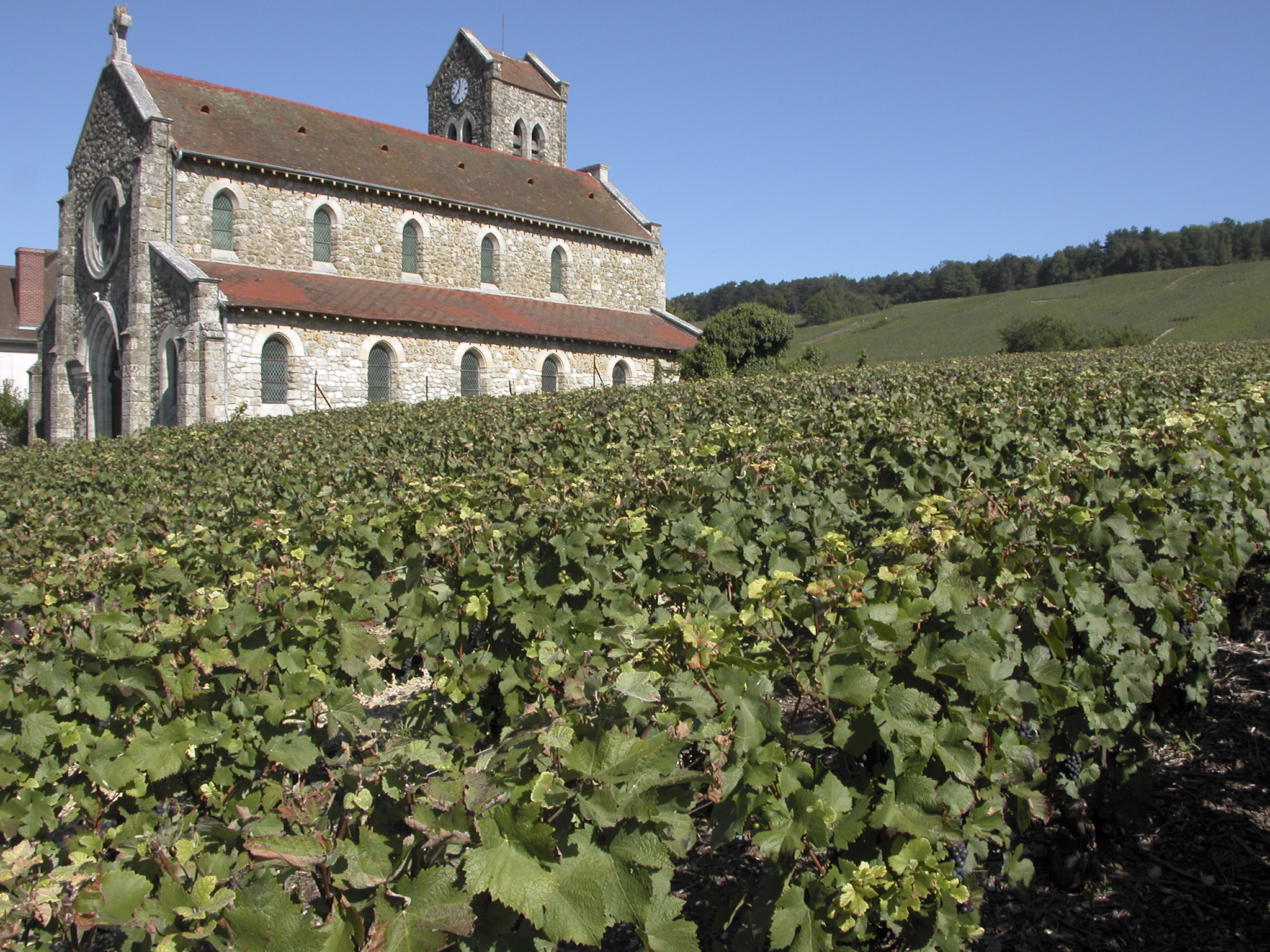
- The church in Leuvrigny
- Location of Leuvrigny
- Location within France Location within Grand Est
- Coordinates: 49°04′09″N 3°45′32″E
- Country: France
- Region: Grand Est
- Department: Marne
- Arrondissement: Épernay
- Canton: Dormans-Paysages de Champagne

Government
  - Mayor (2020–2026): Christophe Chatelain
- Area^{1}: 8 km^{2} (3.1 sq mi)
- Elevation: 132 m (433 ft)
- Population (2023): 316
  - Density: 39/km^{2} (100/sq mi)
- Time zone: UTC+01:00 (CET)
  - Summer (DST): UTC+02:00 (CEST)
- INSEE/Postal code: 51320 /51700
- ^{1} French Land Register data, which excludes lakes, ponds, glaciers > 1 km^{2} (0.386 sq mi or 247 acres) and river estuaries.

Leuvrigny (French pronunciation: [lœvʁiɲi]) is a commune in the Marne department in north-eastern France.

== See also ==
- Communes of the Marne department
