= La Chapelle-sous-Orbais =

- Commune
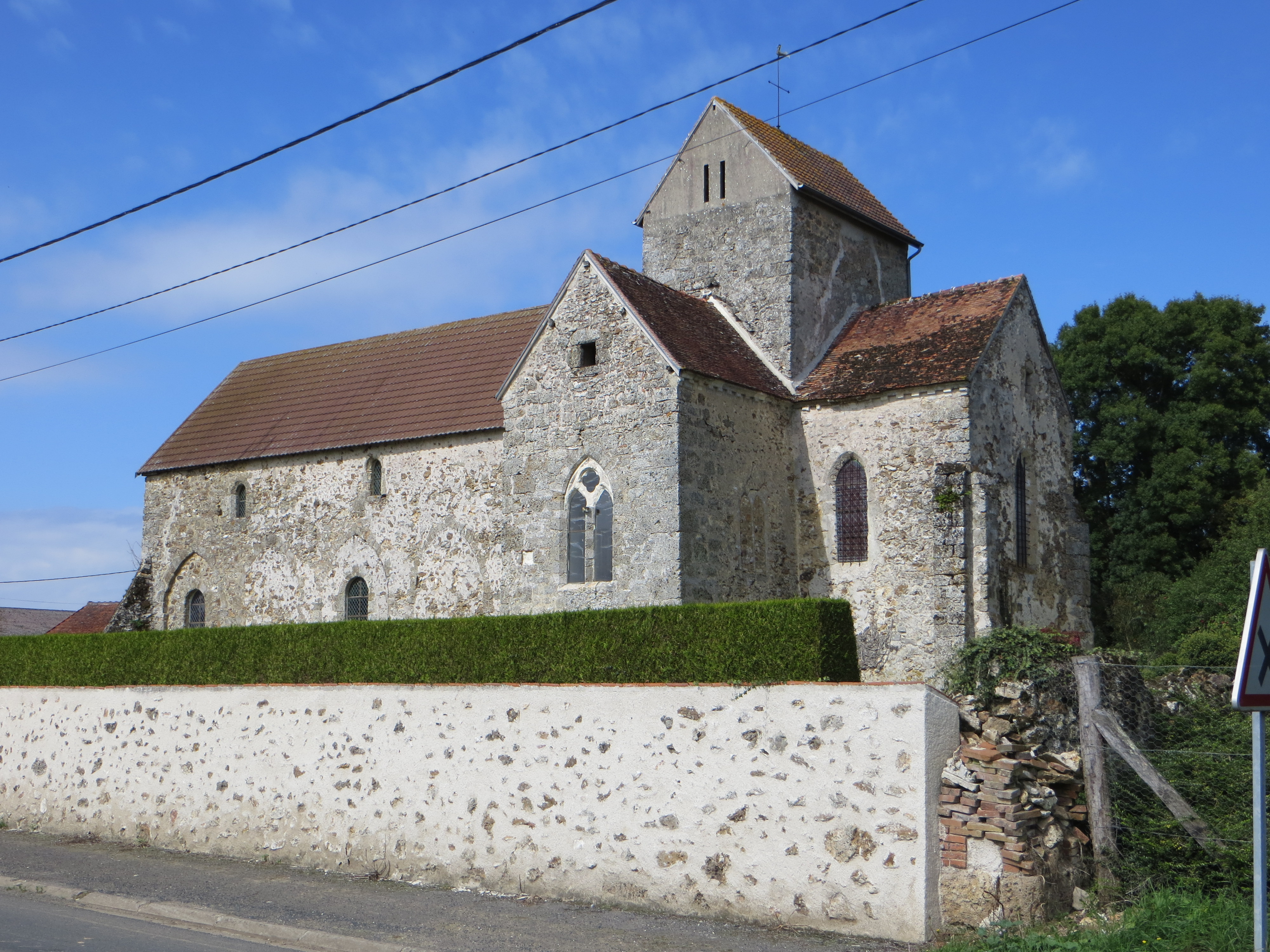
- The church in La Chapelle-sous-Orbais
- Location of La Chapelle-sous-Orbais
- Location within France Location within Grand Est
- Coordinates: 48°54′37″N 3°43′57″E
- Country: France
- Region: Grand Est
- Department: Marne
- Arrondissement: Épernay
- Canton: Dormans-Paysages de Champagne
- Intercommunality: Paysages de la Champagne

Government
  - Mayor (2020–2026): Christophe Petit
- Area^{1}: 14.54 km^{2} (5.61 sq mi)
- Elevation: 234 m (768 ft)
- Population (2023): 53
  - Density: 3.6/km^{2} (9.4/sq mi)
- Time zone: UTC+01:00 (CET)
  - Summer (DST): UTC+02:00 (CEST)
- INSEE/Postal code: 51128 /51270
- ^{1} French Land Register data, which excludes lakes, ponds, glaciers > 1 km^{2} (0.386 sq mi or 247 acres) and river estuaries.

La Chapelle-sous-Orbais (French pronunciation: [la ʃapɛl su.z‿ɔʁbɛ], literally The Chapel under Orbais) is a commune in the Marne department in north-eastern France.

== See also ==
- Communes of the Marne department
