= Œuilly, Marne =

Œuilly
- Commune
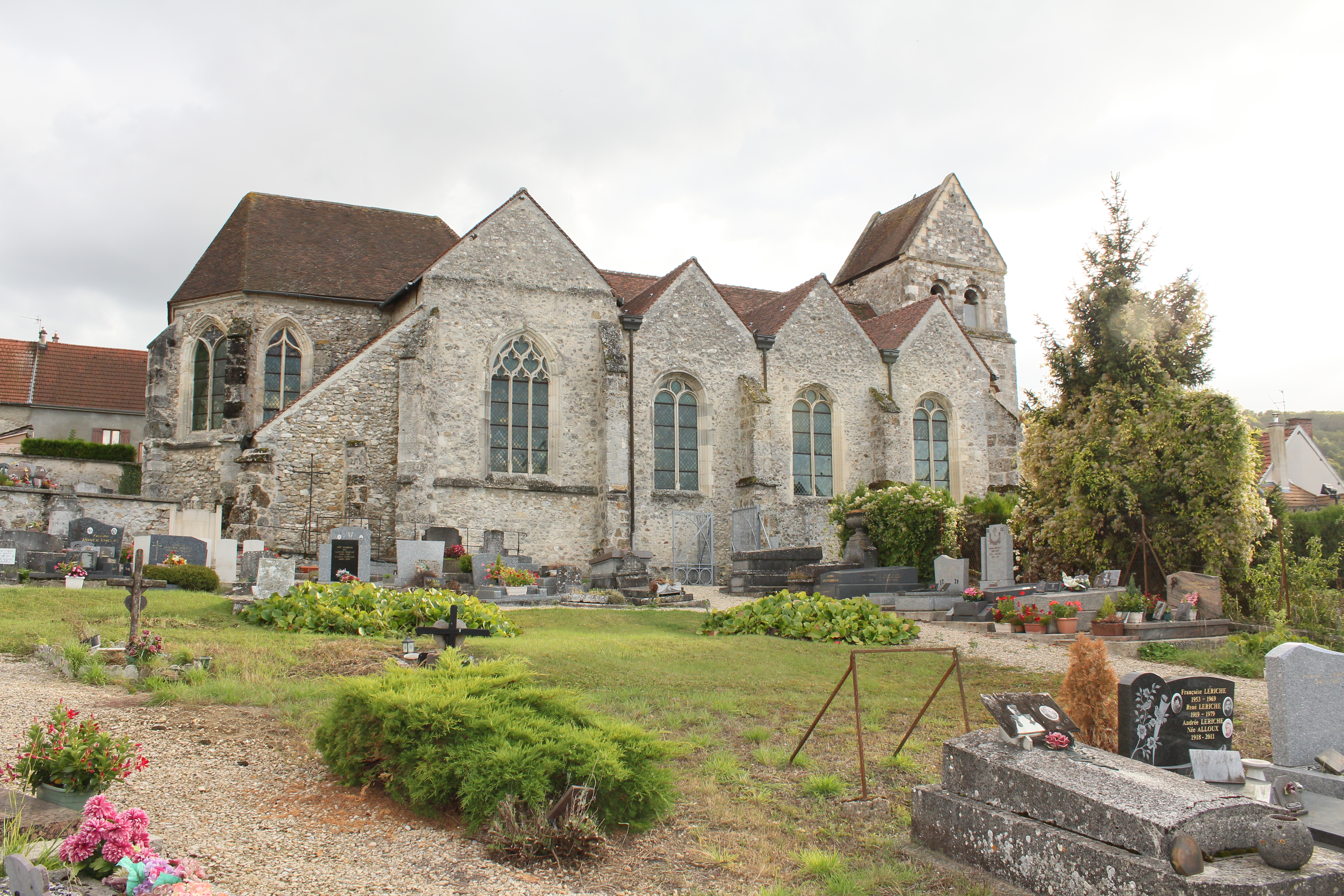
- St. Memmie's Church

- Coat of arms
- Location of Œuilly
- Location within France Location within Grand Est
- Coordinates: 49°04′28″N 3°47′39″E
- Country: France
- Region: Grand Est
- Department: Marne
- Arrondissement: Épernay
- Canton: Dormans-Paysages de Champagne
- Intercommunality: Paysages de la Champagne

Government
  - Mayor (2020–2026): Stéphane Boulant
- Area^{1}: 9.3 km^{2} (3.6 sq mi)
- Elevation: 175 m (574 ft)
- Population (2023): 564
  - Density: 61/km^{2} (160/sq mi)
- Time zone: UTC+01:00 (CET)
  - Summer (DST): UTC+02:00 (CEST)
- INSEE/Postal code: 51410 /51480
- ^{1} French Land Register data, which excludes lakes, ponds, glaciers > 1 km^{2} (0.386 sq mi or 247 acres) and river estuaries.

Œuilly (French pronunciation: [œji]) is a commune in the Marne department in the Grand Est region in north-eastern France.

== See also ==
- Communes of the Marne department
