= Canton of Dormans-Paysages de Champagne =

Canton of Marne department, France

Coordinates: 49.07°N 3.64°E

The canton of Dormans-Paysages de Champagne is an administrative division of the Marne department, northeastern France. It was created at the French canton reorganisation which came into effect in March 2015. Its seat is in Dormans.

It consists of the following communes:

1. Anthenay
2. Aougny
3. Le Baizil
4. Bannay
5. Baslieux-sous-Châtillon
6. Baye
7. Beaunay
8. Belval-sous-Châtillon
9. Bligny
10. Boursault
11. Le Breuil
12. Brouillet
13. La Caure
14. Chambrecy
15. Champaubert
16. Champlat-et-Boujacourt
17. Champvoisy
18. La Chapelle-sous-Orbais
19. Châtillon-sur-Marne
20. Chaumuzy
21. Cœur-de-la-Vallée
22. Coizard-Joches
23. Congy
24. Cormoyeux
25. Corribert
26. Courjeonnet
27. Courthiézy
28. Cuchery
29. Cuisles
30. Damery
31. Dormans
32. Étoges
33. Fèrebrianges
34. Festigny
35. Fleury-la-Rivière
36. Igny-Comblizy
37. Jonquery
38. Lagery
39. Leuvrigny
40. Lhéry
41. Mareuil-en-Brie
42. Mareuil-le-Port
43. Marfaux
44. Margny
45. Montmort-Lucy
46. Nesle-le-Repons
47. La Neuville-aux-Larris
48. Œuilly
49. Olizy
50. Orbais-l'Abbaye
51. Passy-Grigny
52. Poilly
53. Pourcy
54. Romery
55. Romigny
56. Sainte-Gemme
57. Saint-Martin-d'Ablois
58. Sarcy
59. Suizy-le-Franc
60. Talus-Saint-Prix
61. Tramery
62. Troissy
63. Vandières
64. Vauciennes
65. Venteuil
66. Verneuil
67. Ville-en-Tardenois
68. La Ville-sous-Orbais
69. Villevenard
70. Vincelles
