= Bannay, Marne =

Bannay
- Commune
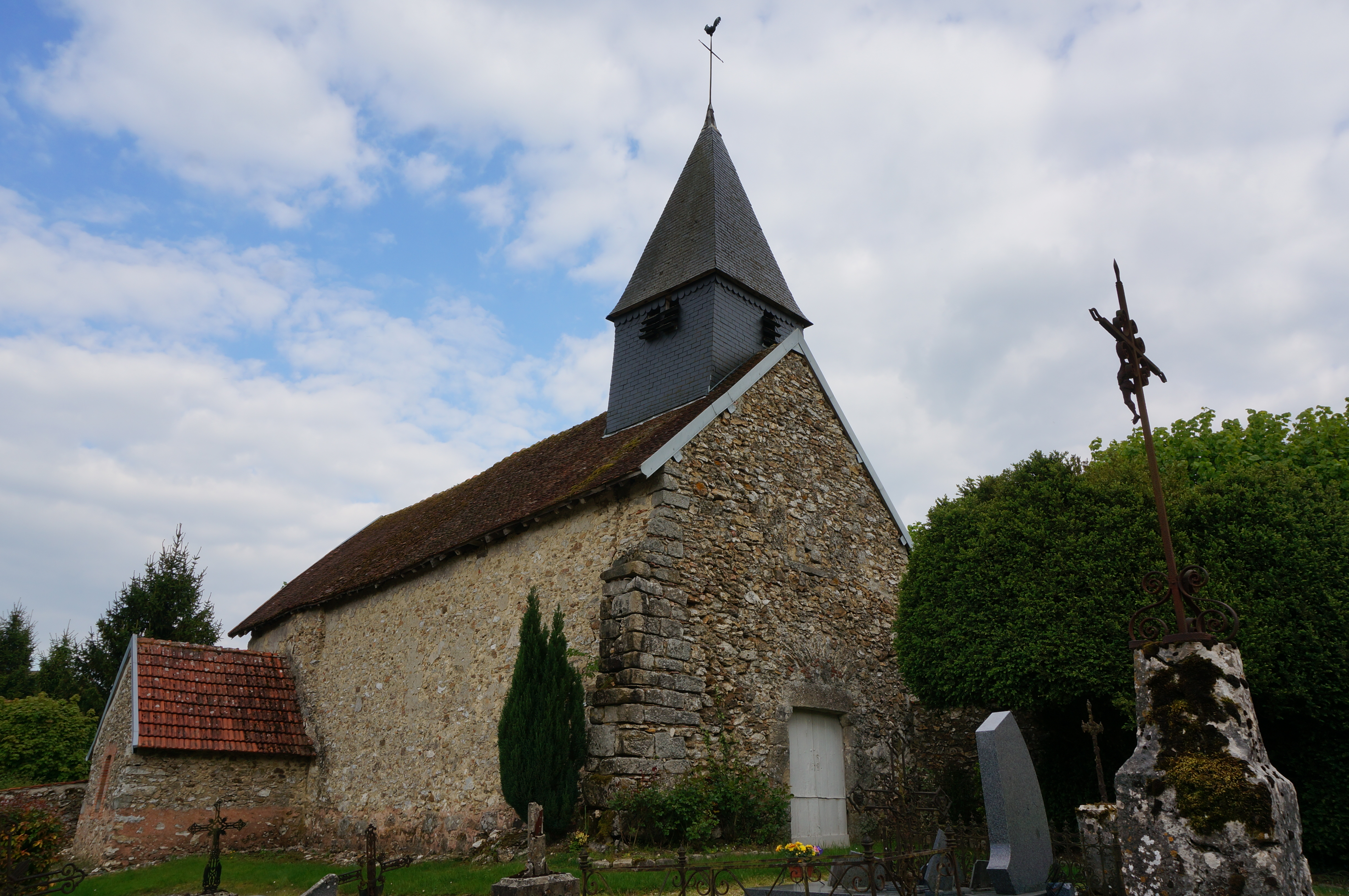
- The church in Bannay
- Location of Bannay
- Location within France Location within Grand Est
- Coordinates: 48°51′35″N 3°43′28″E
- Country: France
- Region: Grand Est
- Department: Marne
- Arrondissement: Épernay
- Canton: Dormans-Paysages de Champagne

Government
  - Mayor (2020–2026): Muguette Lebon
- Area^{1}: 7.06 km^{2} (2.73 sq mi)
- Elevation: 212 m (696 ft)
- Population (2023): 23
  - Density: 3.3/km^{2} (8.4/sq mi)
- Time zone: UTC+01:00 (CET)
  - Summer (DST): UTC+02:00 (CEST)
- INSEE/Postal code: 51034 /51270
- ^{1} French Land Register data, which excludes lakes, ponds, glaciers > 1 km^{2} (0.386 sq mi or 247 acres) and river estuaries.

Bannay (French pronunciation: [banɛ]) is a commune in the Marne department in northeastern France.

== Population ==
Historical population
Year	Pop.	±% p.a.
1968	26	—
1975	18	−5.12%
1982	20	+1.52%
1990	26	+3.33%
1999	27	+0.42%
2007	22	−2.53%
2012	14	−8.64%
2017	19	+6.30%
2023	23	+3.24%
Source: INSEE

== See also ==
- Communes of the Marne department
