= Champlat-et-Boujacourt =

- Commune
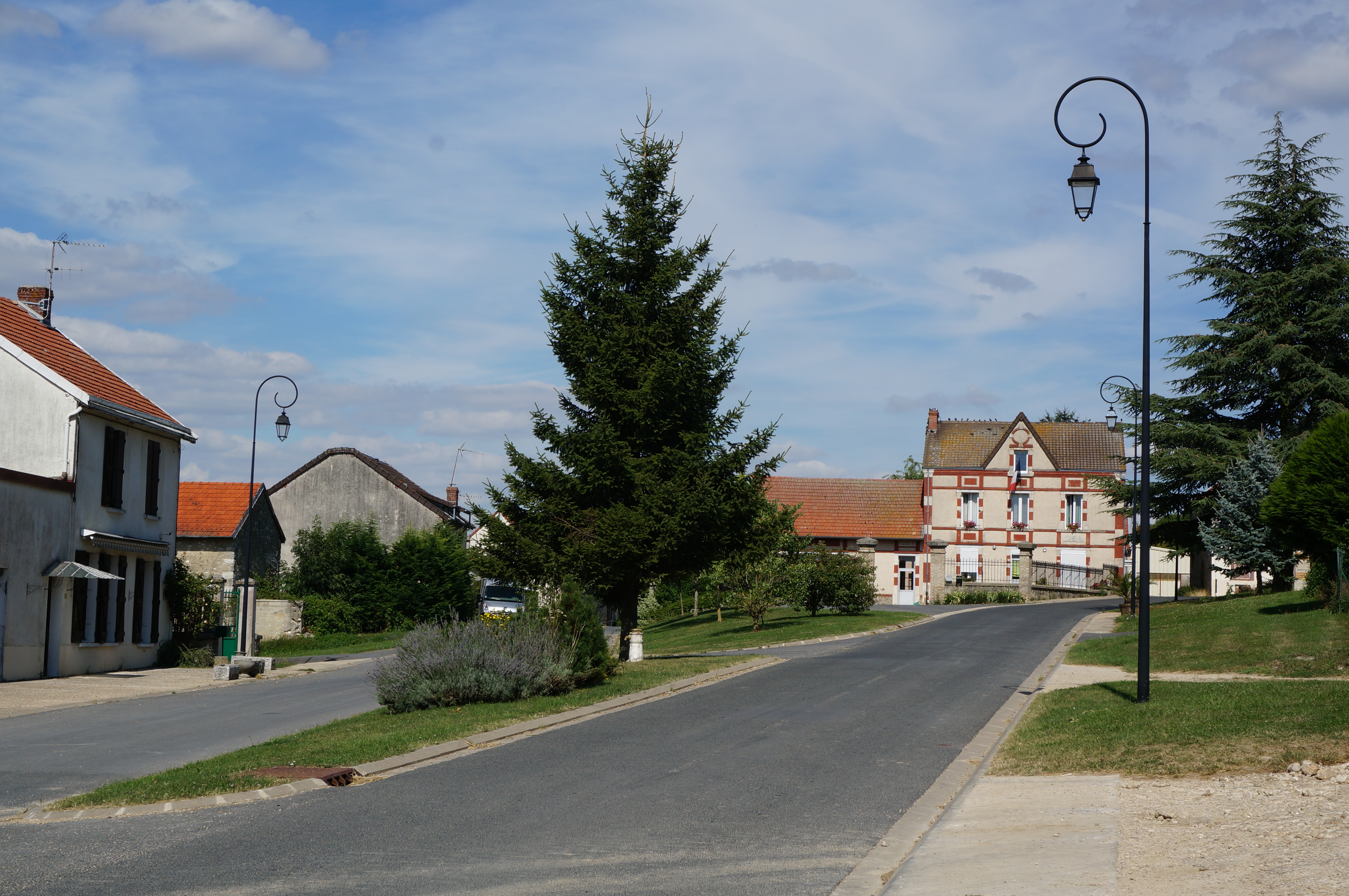
- The town hall in Champlat-et-Boujacourt
- Location of Champlat-et-Boujacourt
- Location within France Location within Grand Est
- Coordinates: 49°09′16″N 3°50′03″E
- Country: France
- Region: Grand Est
- Department: Marne
- Arrondissement: Épernay
- Canton: Dormans-Paysages de Champagne
- Intercommunality: Paysages de la Champagne

Government
  - Mayor (2020–2026): Laurent Couvreur
- Area^{1}: 6.36 km^{2} (2.46 sq mi)
- Elevation: 214 m (702 ft)
- Population (2023): 139
  - Density: 21.9/km^{2} (56.6/sq mi)
- Time zone: UTC+01:00 (CET)
  - Summer (DST): UTC+02:00 (CEST)
- INSEE/Postal code: 51120 /51480
- ^{1} French Land Register data, which excludes lakes, ponds, glaciers > 1 km^{2} (0.386 sq mi or 247 acres) and river estuaries.

Champlat-et-Boujacourt (French pronunciation: [ʃɑ̃pla e buʒakuʁ]) is a commune in the Marne department in north-eastern France.

== See also ==
- Communes of the Marne department
