= Champvoisy =

- Commune
- Location of Champvoisy
- Location within France Location within Grand Est
- Coordinates: 49°07′52″N 3°38′14″E
- Country: France
- Region: Grand Est
- Department: Marne
- Arrondissement: Épernay
- Canton: Dormans-Paysages de Champagne
- Intercommunality: Paysages de la Champagne

Government
  - Mayor (2020–2026): Laurent Grosdidier
- Area^{1}: 9.2 km^{2} (3.6 sq mi)
- Elevation: 150 m (490 ft)
- Population (2023): 252
  - Density: 27/km^{2} (71/sq mi)
- Time zone: UTC+01:00 (CET)
  - Summer (DST): UTC+02:00 (CEST)
- INSEE/Postal code: 51121 /51700
- ^{1} French Land Register data, which excludes lakes, ponds, glaciers > 1 km^{2} (0.386 sq mi or 247 acres) and river estuaries.

Champvoisy (French pronunciation: [ʃɑ̃vwazi]) is a commune in the Marne department in north-eastern France. It is a rural municipality, with a very low population density (27 /km^{2} in 2017). The municipality is part of the functional area of Reims, which is composed of 294 municipalities.

== Geography ==
The primary land use of the municipality is agriculture. According to the CORINE Land Cover database, it is composed of arable land (54.1%), forests (22.3%), heterogeneous agricultural areas (9.3%), grasslands (8.6%), permanent crops (5.1%), industrial or commercial areas and communication network (0.6%).

== History ==
Champvoisy depended on the custom of Vitry and the presidial of Château-Thierry, the first known lord, in 1172, was Thierry de Pierepont. It also came under the monks of Coincy, of the commandery of Passy which had a chapel there.

== Demography ==
Historical population
Year	Pop.	±% p.a.
1968	161	—
1975	153	−0.73%
1982	160	+0.64%
1990	184	+1.76%
1999	174	−0.62%
2007	198	+1.63%
2012	273	+6.63%
2017	249	−1.82%
2023	252	+0.20%
Source: INSEE

== See also ==
- Communes of the Marne department
