= Festigny, Marne =

Festigny
- Commune
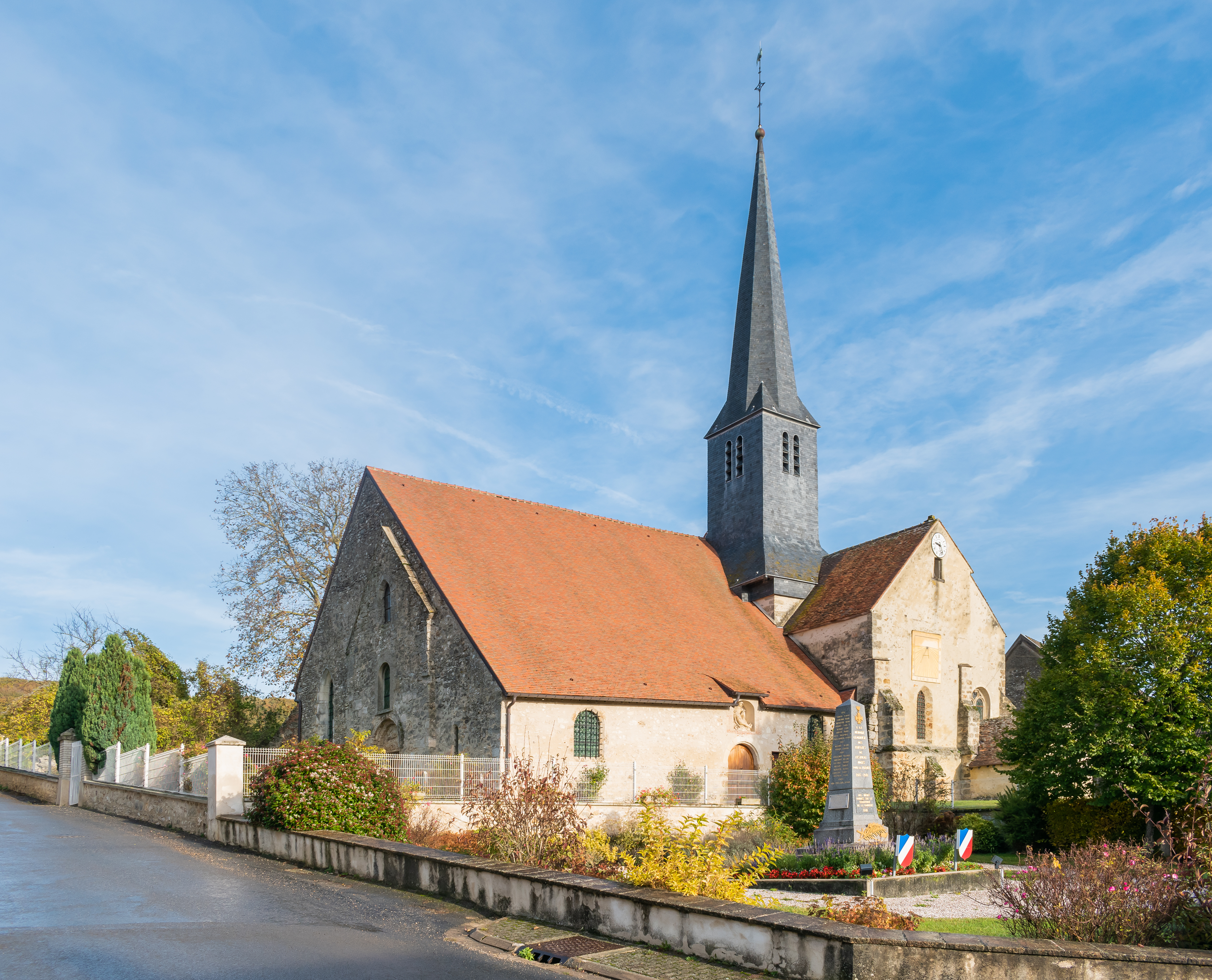
- The church in Festigny

- Coat of arms
- Location of Festigny
- Location within France Location within Grand Est
- Coordinates: 49°03′09″N 3°44′47″E
- Country: France
- Region: Grand Est
- Department: Marne
- Arrondissement: Épernay
- Canton: Dormans-Paysages de Champagne

Government
  - Mayor (2020–2026): Michel Loriot
- Area^{1}: 25.63 km^{2} (9.90 sq mi)
- Elevation: 108 m (354 ft)
- Population (2023): 394
  - Density: 15.4/km^{2} (39.8/sq mi)
- Time zone: UTC+01:00 (CET)
  - Summer (DST): UTC+02:00 (CEST)
- INSEE/Postal code: 51249 /51700
- ^{1} French Land Register data, which excludes lakes, ponds, glaciers > 1 km^{2} (0.386 sq mi or 247 acres) and river estuaries.

Festigny (French pronunciation: [fɛstiɲi]) is a commune in the Marne department in north-eastern France.

== See also ==
- Communes of the Marne department
