= Courthiézy =

- Commune
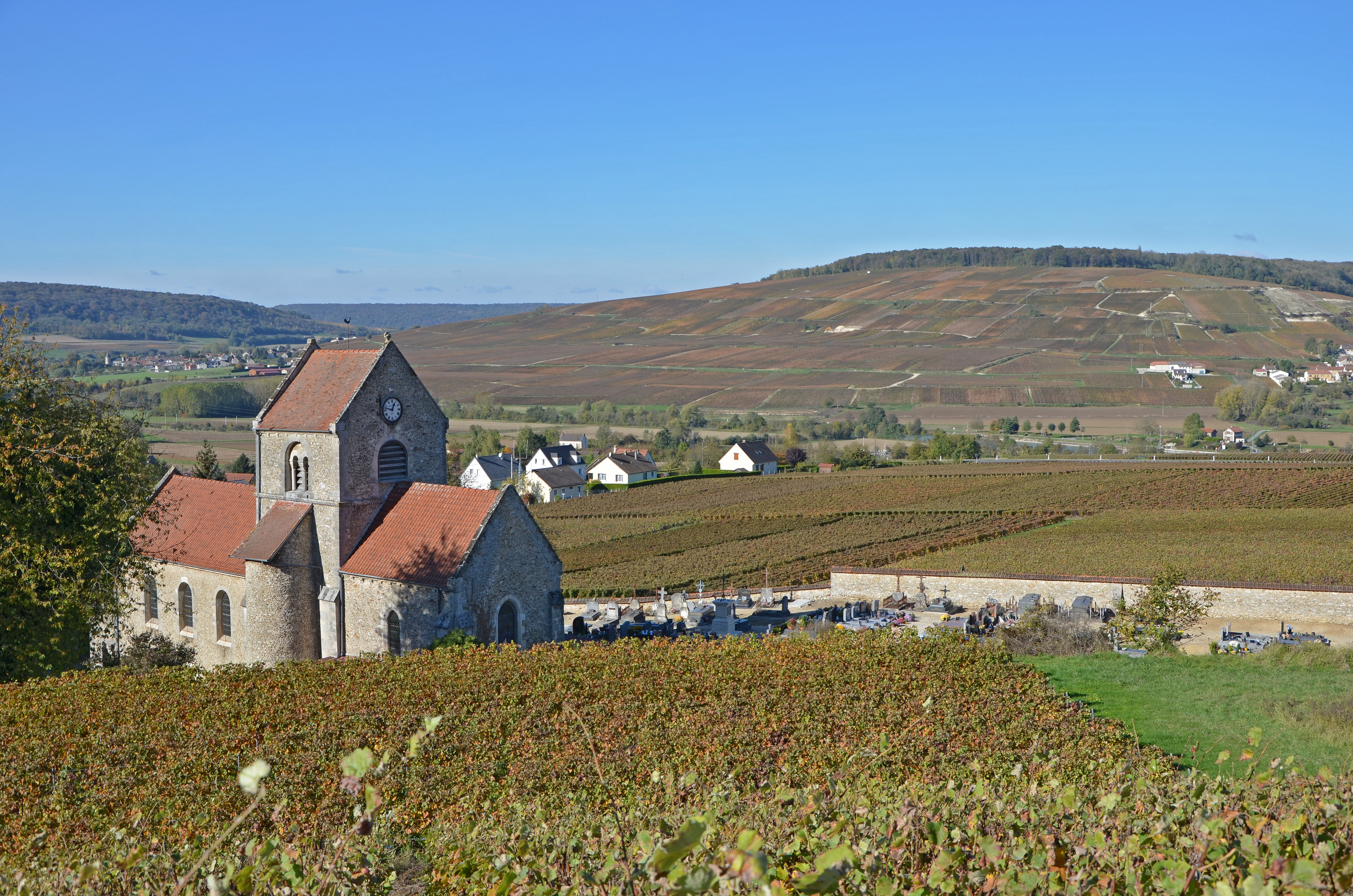
- The church and vineyards in Courthiézy
- Location of Courthiézy
- Location within France Location within Grand Est
- Coordinates: 49°03′11″N 3°35′54″E
- Country: France
- Region: Grand Est
- Department: Marne
- Arrondissement: Épernay
- Canton: Dormans-Paysages de Champagne

Government
  - Mayor (2020–2026): Sylvain Bizzocchi
- Area^{1}: 5.89 km^{2} (2.27 sq mi)
- Elevation: 66 m (217 ft)
- Population (2023): 339
  - Density: 57.6/km^{2} (149/sq mi)
- Time zone: UTC+01:00 (CET)
  - Summer (DST): UTC+02:00 (CEST)
- INSEE/Postal code: 51192 /51700
- ^{1} French Land Register data, which excludes lakes, ponds, glaciers > 1 km^{2} (0.386 sq mi or 247 acres) and river estuaries.

Courthiézy (French pronunciation: [kuʁtjezi]) is a commune in the Marne department in north-eastern France.

== See also ==
- Communes of the Marne department
