= Saint-Martin-d'Ablois =

- Commune
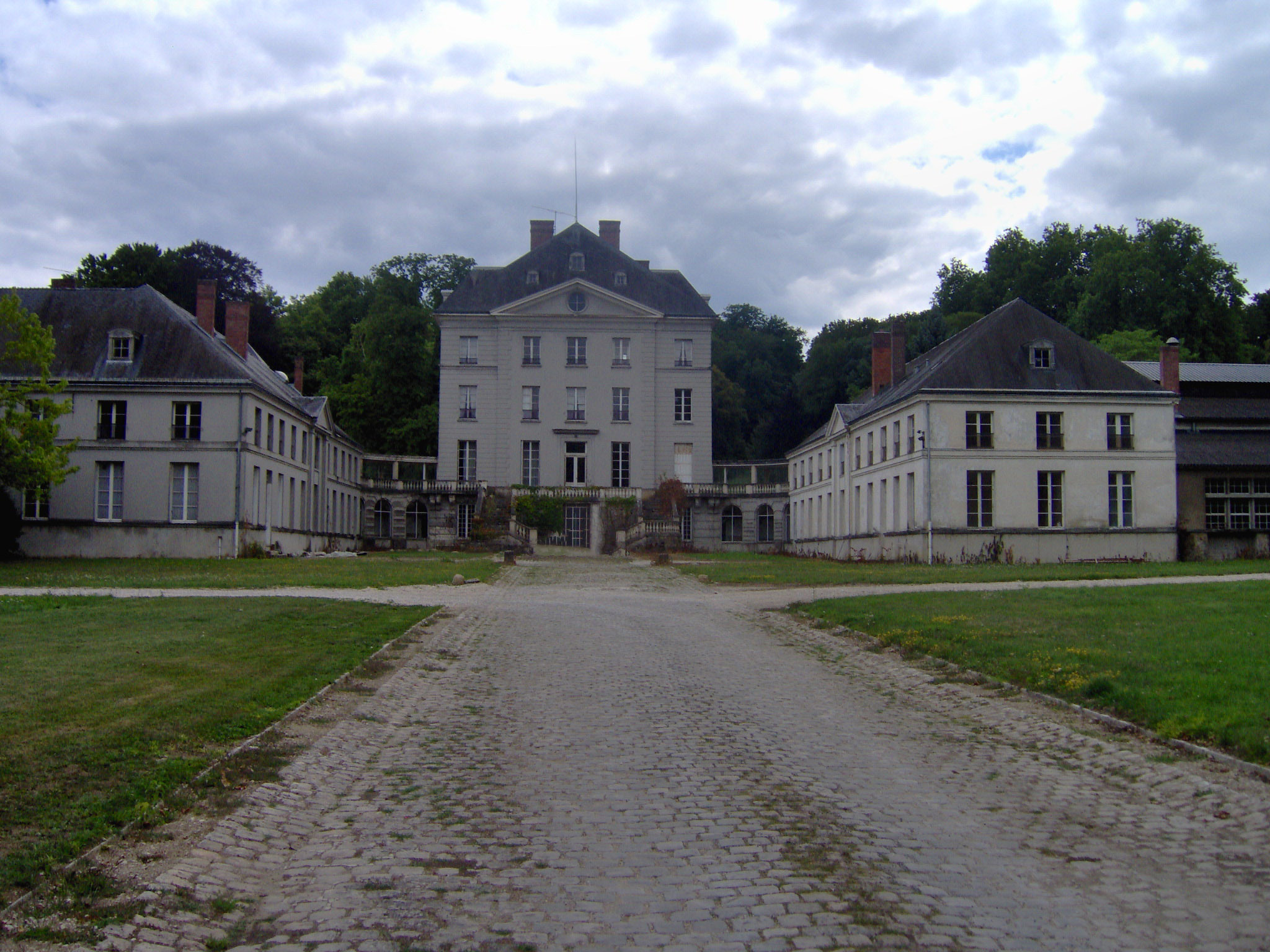
- The chateau in Saint-Martin-d'Ablois

- Coat of arms
- Location of Saint-Martin-d'Ablois
- Location within France Location within Grand Est
- Coordinates: 49°00′47″N 3°52′07″E
- Country: France
- Region: Grand Est
- Department: Marne
- Arrondissement: Épernay
- Canton: Dormans-Paysages de Champagne

Government
  - Mayor (2020–2026): Catherine Fontanesi
- Area^{1}: 21.88 km^{2} (8.45 sq mi)
- Elevation: 147 m (482 ft)
- Highest elevation: 241 m (791 ft)
- Lowest elevation: 110 m (360 ft)
- Population (2023): 1,336
  - Density: 61.06/km^{2} (158.1/sq mi)
- Time zone: UTC+01:00 (CET)
  - Summer (DST): UTC+02:00 (CEST)
- INSEE/Postal code: 51002 /51530
- ^{1} French Land Register data, which excludes lakes, ponds, glaciers > 1 km^{2} (0.386 sq mi or 247 acres) and river estuaries.

Saint-Martin-d'Ablois (French pronunciation: [sɛ̃ maʁtɛ̃ dablwa]) is a commune in the Marne département in north-eastern France.

== See also ==
- Communes of the Marne department
