= Margny, Marne =

Margny
- Commune
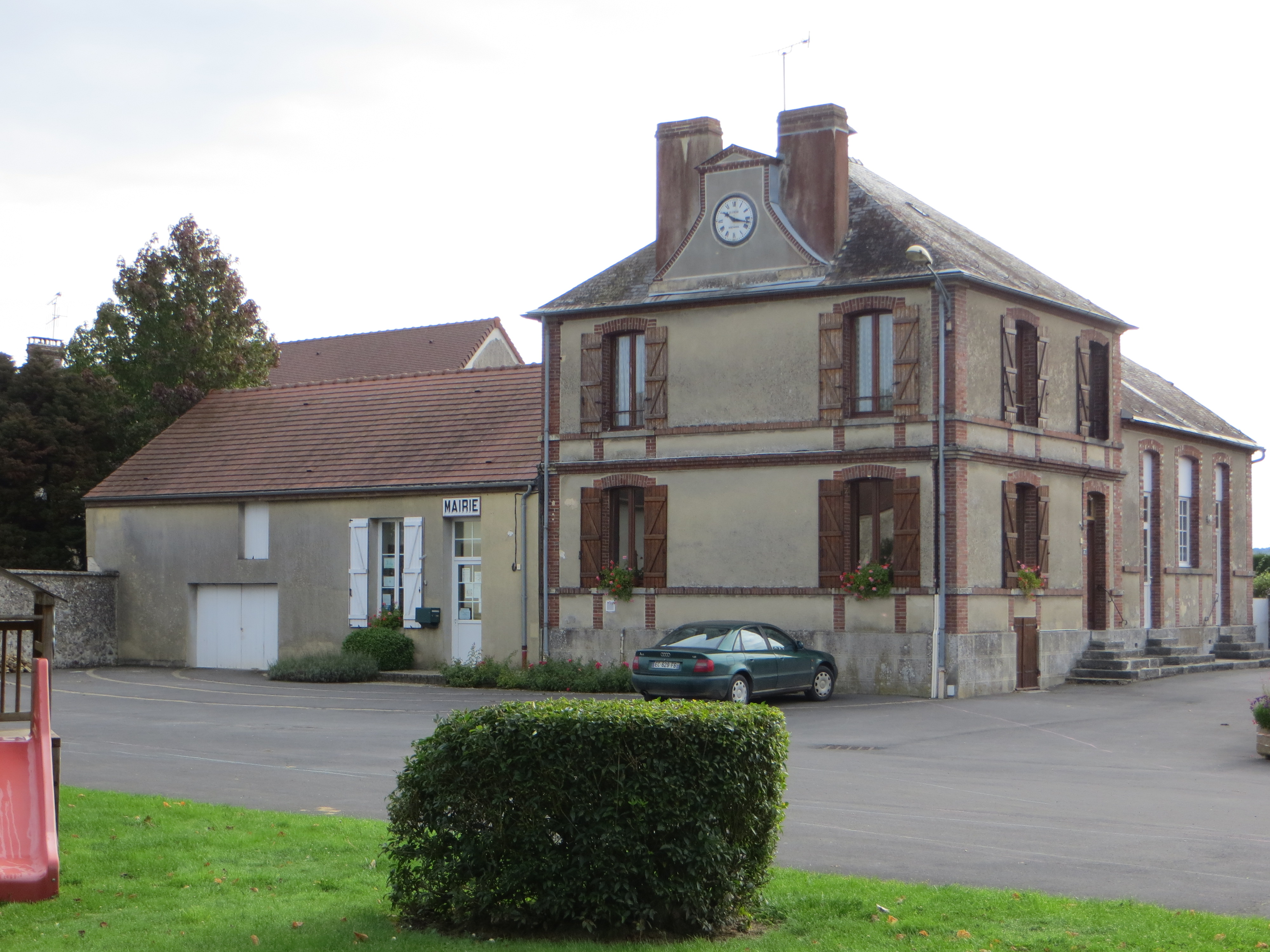
- The town hall in Margny
- Location of Margny
- Location within France Location within Grand Est
- Coordinates: 48°55′52″N 3°38′42″E
- Country: France
- Region: Grand Est
- Department: Marne
- Arrondissement: Épernay
- Canton: Dormans-Paysages de Champagne
- Intercommunality: Brie Champenoise

Government
  - Mayor (2020–2026): Claudia Cousin
- Area^{1}: 10.53 km^{2} (4.07 sq mi)
- Elevation: 199 m (653 ft)
- Population (2023): 119
  - Density: 11.3/km^{2} (29.3/sq mi)
- Time zone: UTC+01:00 (CET)
  - Summer (DST): UTC+02:00 (CEST)
- INSEE/Postal code: 51350 /51210
- ^{1} French Land Register data, which excludes lakes, ponds, glaciers > 1 km^{2} (0.386 sq mi or 247 acres) and river estuaries.

Margny (French pronunciation: [maʁɲi]) is a commune in the Marne department in north-eastern France.

== See also ==
- Communes of the Marne department
