= Brouillet =

- Commune
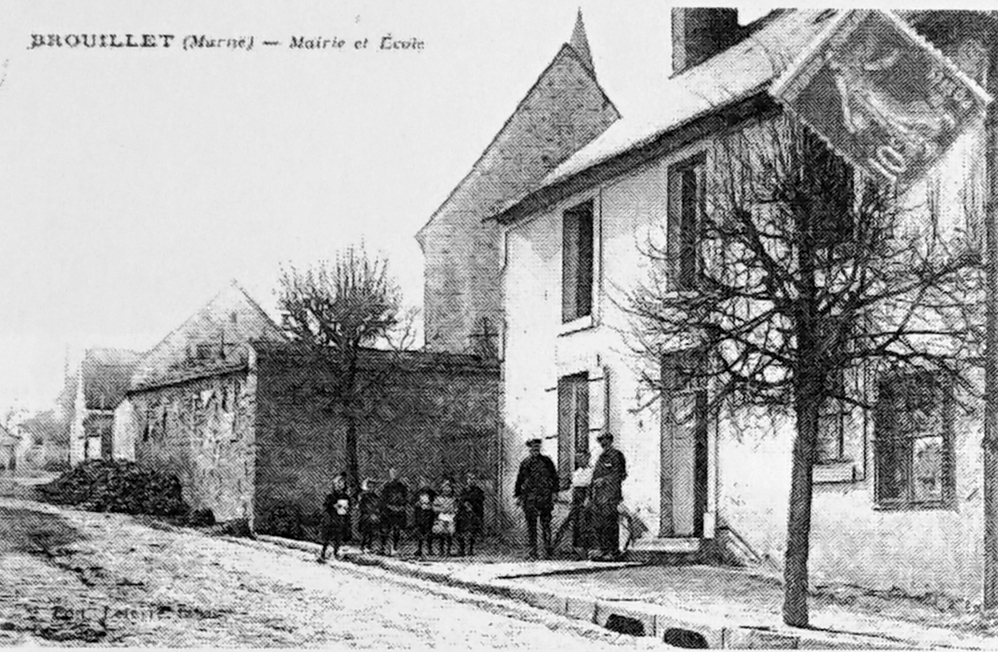
- An old view of the town hall and school in Brouillet
- Location of Brouillet
- Location within France Location within Grand Est
- Coordinates: 49°13′36″N 3°44′23″E
- Country: France
- Region: Grand Est
- Department: Marne
- Arrondissement: Reims
- Canton: Dormans-Paysages de Champagne
- Intercommunality: CU Grand Reims

Government
  - Mayor (2020–2026): Paul-Vincent Ariston
- Area^{1}: 4.58 km^{2} (1.77 sq mi)
- Elevation: 110 m (360 ft)
- Population (2023): 68
  - Density: 15/km^{2} (38/sq mi)
- Time zone: UTC+01:00 (CET)
  - Summer (DST): UTC+02:00 (CEST)
- INSEE/Postal code: 51089 /51170
- ^{1} French Land Register data, which excludes lakes, ponds, glaciers > 1 km^{2} (0.386 sq mi or 247 acres) and river estuaries.

Brouillet (French pronunciation: [bʁujɛ]) is a commune in the Marne department in northeastern France.

== Population ==
Historical population
Year	Pop.	±% p.a.
1968	63	—
1975	73	+2.13%
1982	79	+1.13%
1990	80	+0.16%
1999	86	+0.81%
2007	91	+0.71%
2012	90	−0.22%
2017	77	−3.07%
2023	68	−2.05%
Source: INSEE

== See also ==
- Communes of the Marne department
