= Congy =

- Commune
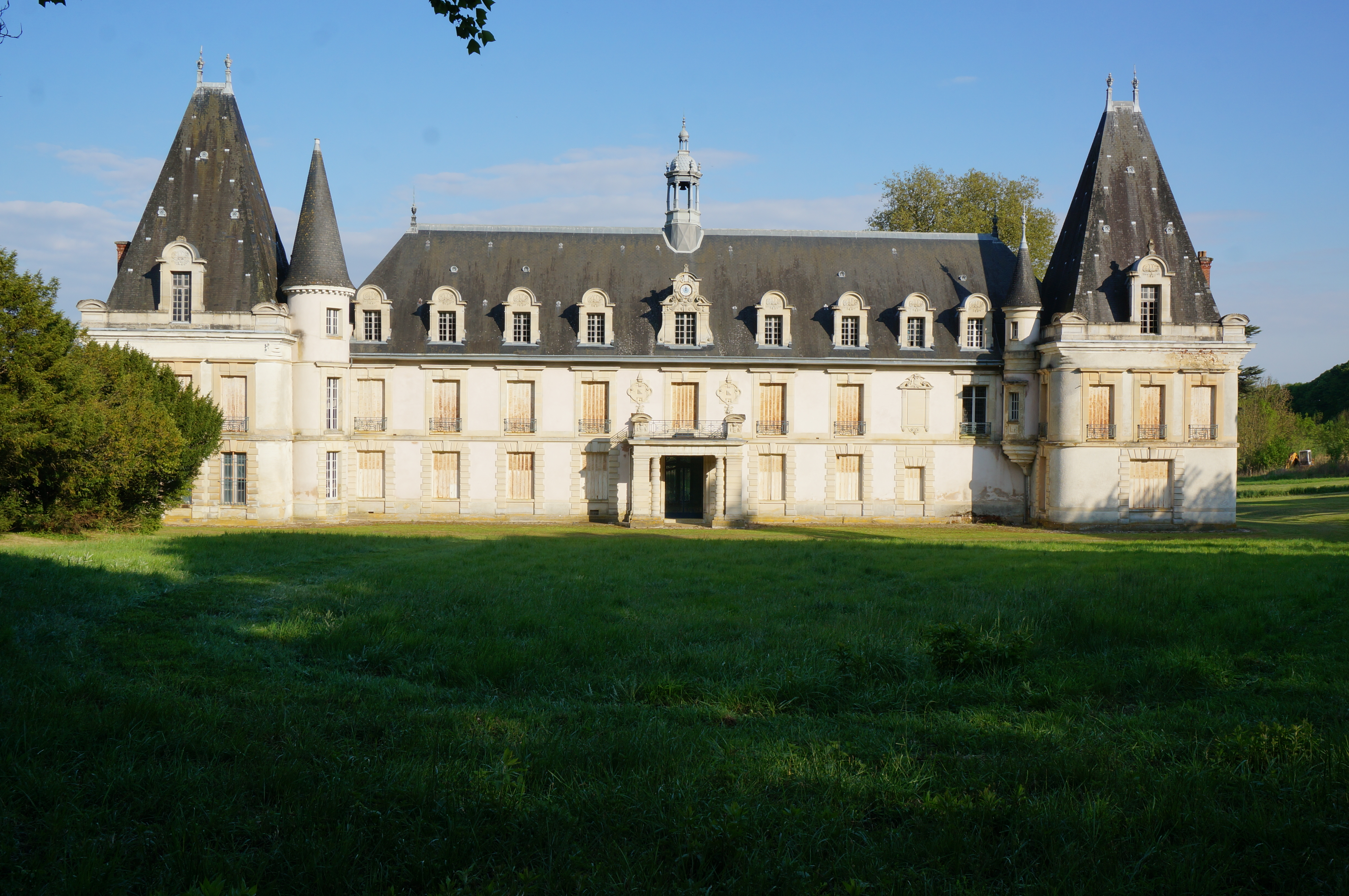
- The chateau in Congy
- Location of Congy
- Location within France Location within Grand Est
- Coordinates: 48°51′37″N 3°49′44″E
- Country: France
- Region: Grand Est
- Department: Marne
- Arrondissement: Épernay
- Canton: Dormans-Paysages de Champagne
- Intercommunality: Paysages de la Champagne

Government
  - Mayor (2020–2026): Jean-François Moussy
- Area^{1}: 17.47 km^{2} (6.75 sq mi)
- Elevation: 200 m (660 ft)
- Population (2023): 257
  - Density: 14.7/km^{2} (38.1/sq mi)
- Time zone: UTC+01:00 (CET)
  - Summer (DST): UTC+02:00 (CEST)
- INSEE/Postal code: 51163 /51270
- ^{1} French Land Register data, which excludes lakes, ponds, glaciers > 1 km^{2} (0.386 sq mi or 247 acres) and river estuaries.

Congy (French pronunciation: [kɔ̃ʒi]) is a commune in the Marne department in north-eastern France.

== See also ==
- Communes of the Marne department
