= Sainte-Gemme, Marne =

Sainte-Gemme
- Commune
- Location of Sainte-Gemme
- Location within France Location within Grand Est
- Coordinates: 49°08′29″N 3°40′18″E
- Country: France
- Region: Grand Est
- Department: Marne
- Arrondissement: Épernay
- Canton: Dormans-Paysages de Champagne

Government
  - Mayor (2020–2026): Jean-Claude Bucquet
- Area^{1}: 7.25 km^{2} (2.80 sq mi)
- Elevation: 228 m (748 ft)
- Population (2023): 135
  - Density: 18.6/km^{2} (48.2/sq mi)
- Time zone: UTC+01:00 (CET)
  - Summer (DST): UTC+02:00 (CEST)
- INSEE/Postal code: 51480 /51700
- ^{1} French Land Register data, which excludes lakes, ponds, glaciers > 1 km^{2} (0.386 sq mi or 247 acres) and river estuaries.

Sainte-Gemme (French pronunciation: [sɛ̃t ʒɛm]) is a commune in the Marne department in north-eastern France.

== See also ==
- Communes of the Marne department
