= Igny-Comblizy =

- Commune
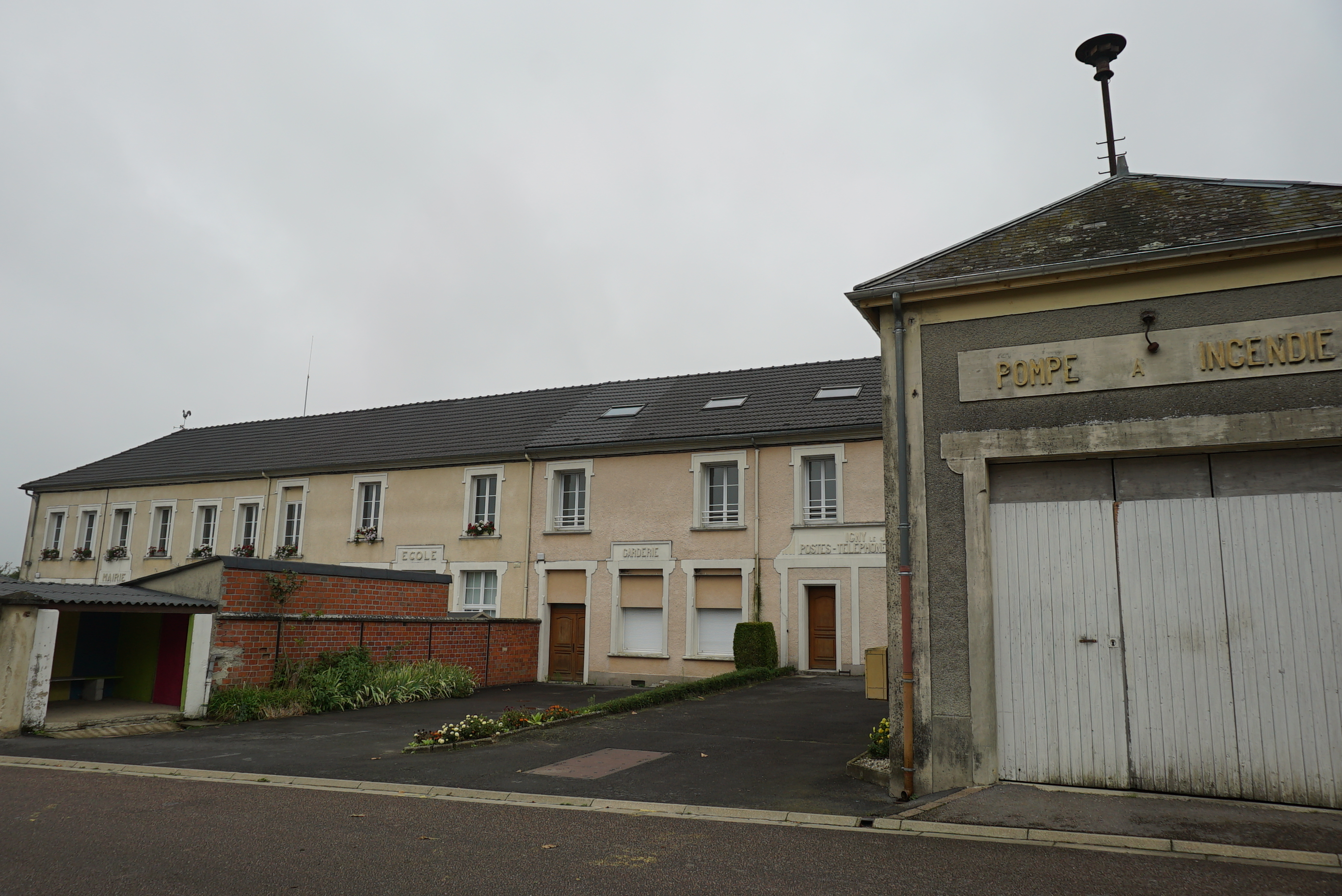
- The town hall in Igny
- Location of Igny-Comblizy
- Location within France Location within Grand Est
- Coordinates: 49°01′10″N 3°42′50″E
- Country: France
- Region: Grand Est
- Department: Marne
- Arrondissement: Épernay
- Canton: Dormans-Paysages de Champagne

Government
  - Mayor (2020–2026): Maryline Vuiblet
- Area^{1}: 40.74 km^{2} (15.73 sq mi)
- Elevation: 214 m (702 ft)
- Population (2023): 431
  - Density: 10.6/km^{2} (27.4/sq mi)
- Time zone: UTC+01:00 (CET)
  - Summer (DST): UTC+02:00 (CEST)
- INSEE/Postal code: 51298 /51700
- ^{1} French Land Register data, which excludes lakes, ponds, glaciers > 1 km^{2} (0.386 sq mi or 247 acres) and river estuaries.

Igny-Comblizy (French pronunciation: [iɲi kɔ̃blizi]) is a commune in the Marne department in north-eastern France.

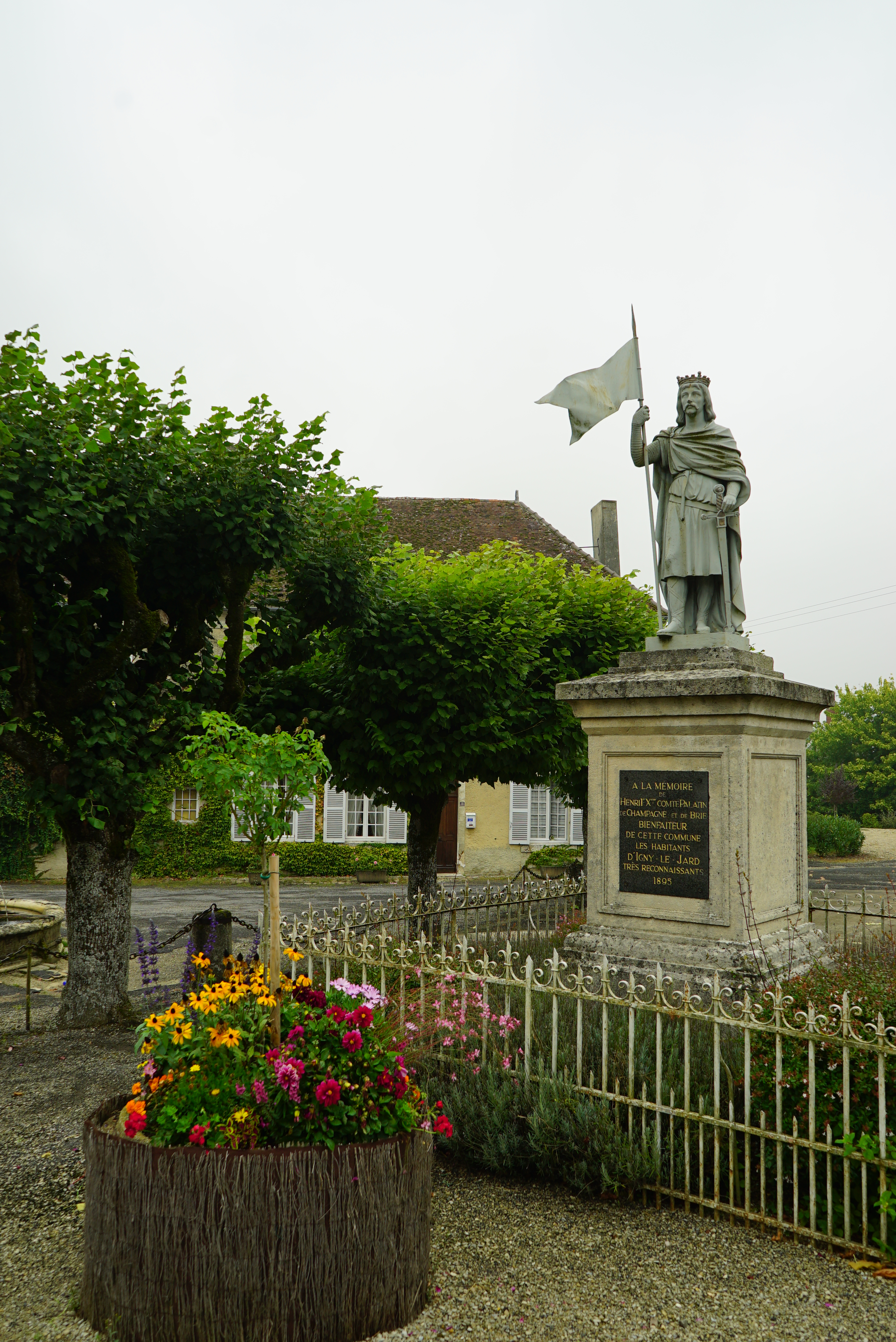
Henry I of Champagne.

== See also ==
- Communes of the Marne department
