= Courjeonnet =

- Commune
- Location of Courjeonnet
- Location within France Location within Grand Est
- Coordinates: 48°49′47″N 3°50′05″E
- Country: France
- Region: Grand Est
- Department: Marne
- Arrondissement: Épernay
- Canton: Dormans-Paysages de Champagne
- Intercommunality: Paysages de la Champagne

Government
  - Mayor (2020–2026): Jean-Claude Simon
- Area^{1}: 5.55 km^{2} (2.14 sq mi)
- Elevation: 148 m (486 ft)
- Population (2023): 49
  - Density: 8.8/km^{2} (23/sq mi)
- Time zone: UTC+01:00 (CET)
  - Summer (DST): UTC+02:00 (CEST)
- INSEE/Postal code: 51186 /51270
- ^{1} French Land Register data, which excludes lakes, ponds, glaciers > 1 km^{2} (0.386 sq mi or 247 acres) and river estuaries.

Courjeonnet (French pronunciation: [kuʁʒɔnɛ]) is a commune in the Marne department in north-eastern France.

== See also ==
- Communes of the Marne department
