= Nesle-le-Repons =

- Commune
- Location of Nesle-le-Repons
- Location within France Location within Grand Est
- Coordinates: 49°02′59″N 3°42′43″E
- Country: France
- Region: Grand Est
- Department: Marne
- Arrondissement: Épernay
- Canton: Dormans-Paysages de Champagne

Government
  - Mayor (2020–2026): Patrick Acker
- Area^{1}: 5.07 km^{2} (1.96 sq mi)
- Elevation: 230 m (750 ft)
- Population (2023): 141
  - Density: 27.8/km^{2} (72.0/sq mi)
- Time zone: UTC+01:00 (CET)
  - Summer (DST): UTC+02:00 (CEST)
- INSEE/Postal code: 51396 /51700
- ^{1} French Land Register data, which excludes lakes, ponds, glaciers > 1 km^{2} (0.386 sq mi or 247 acres) and river estuaries.

Nesle-le-Repons (French pronunciation: [nɛl lə ʁəpɔ̃]) is a commune in the Marne department in north-eastern France.

== See also ==
- Communes of the Marne department
