= Beaunay =

- Commune
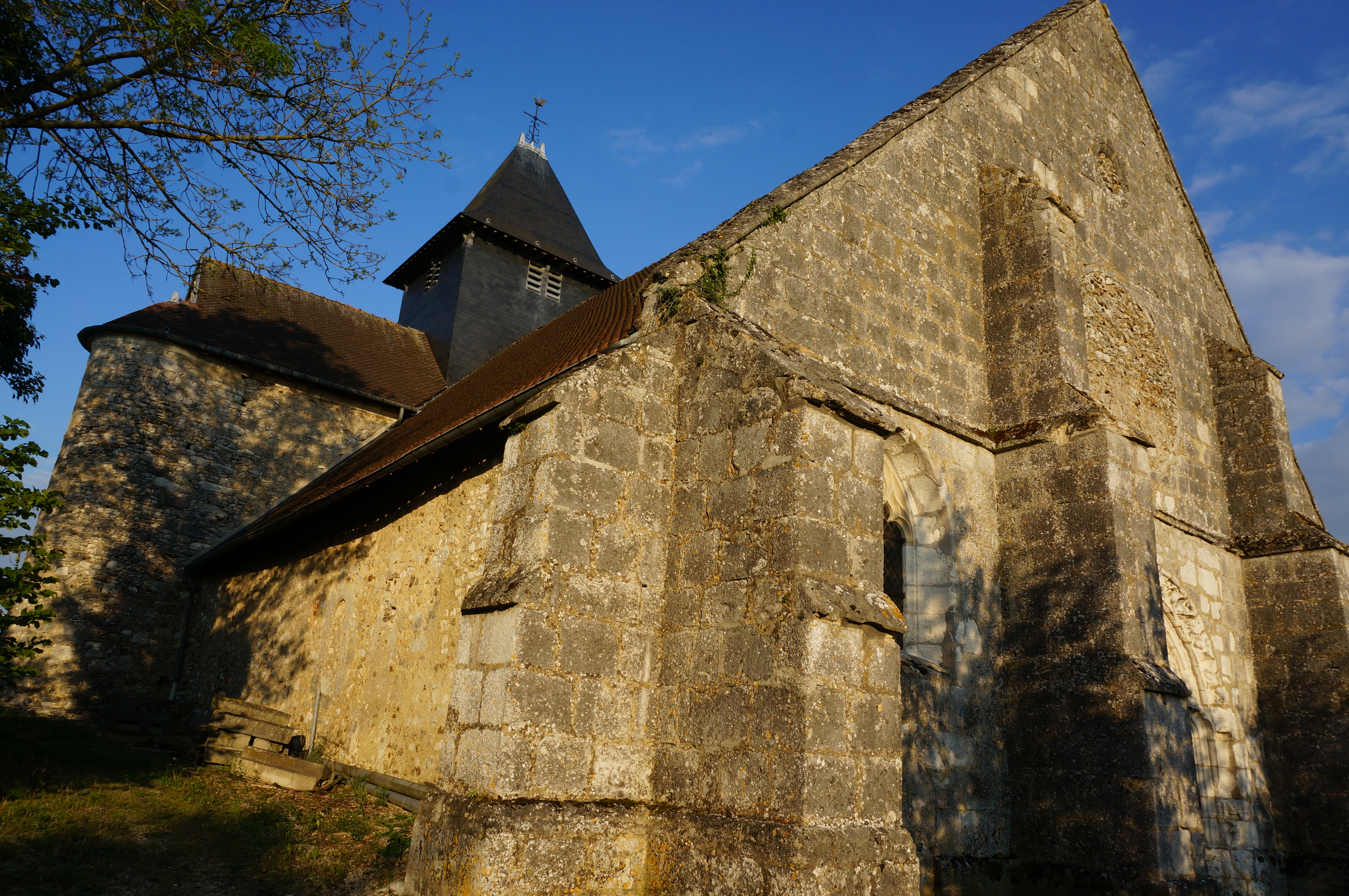
- The church in Beaunay
- Location of Beaunay
- Location within France Location within Grand Est
- Coordinates: 48°53′06″N 3°52′42″E
- Country: France
- Region: Grand Est
- Department: Marne
- Arrondissement: Épernay
- Canton: Dormans-Paysages de Champagne

Government
  - Mayor (2020–2026): Maurice Lombard
- Area^{1}: 3.53 km^{2} (1.36 sq mi)
- Elevation: 173 m (568 ft)
- Population (2023): 102
  - Density: 28.9/km^{2} (74.8/sq mi)
- Time zone: UTC+01:00 (CET)
  - Summer (DST): UTC+02:00 (CEST)
- INSEE/Postal code: 51045 /51270
- ^{1} French Land Register data, which excludes lakes, ponds, glaciers > 1 km^{2} (0.386 sq mi or 247 acres) and river estuaries.

Beaunay (French pronunciation: [bonɛ]) is a commune in the Marne department in northeastern France.

== Population ==
Historical population
Year	Pop.	±% p.a.
1968	99	—
1975	91	−1.20%
1982	112	+3.01%
1990	113	+0.11%
1999	114	+0.10%
2007	101	−1.50%
2012	105	+0.78%
2017	106	+0.19%
2023	102	−0.64%
Source: INSEE

== Personalities ==
Beaunay is the birthplace of thoroughbred racehorse trainer, François Boutin.

== See also ==
- Communes of the Marne department
