= Fèrebrianges =

- Commune
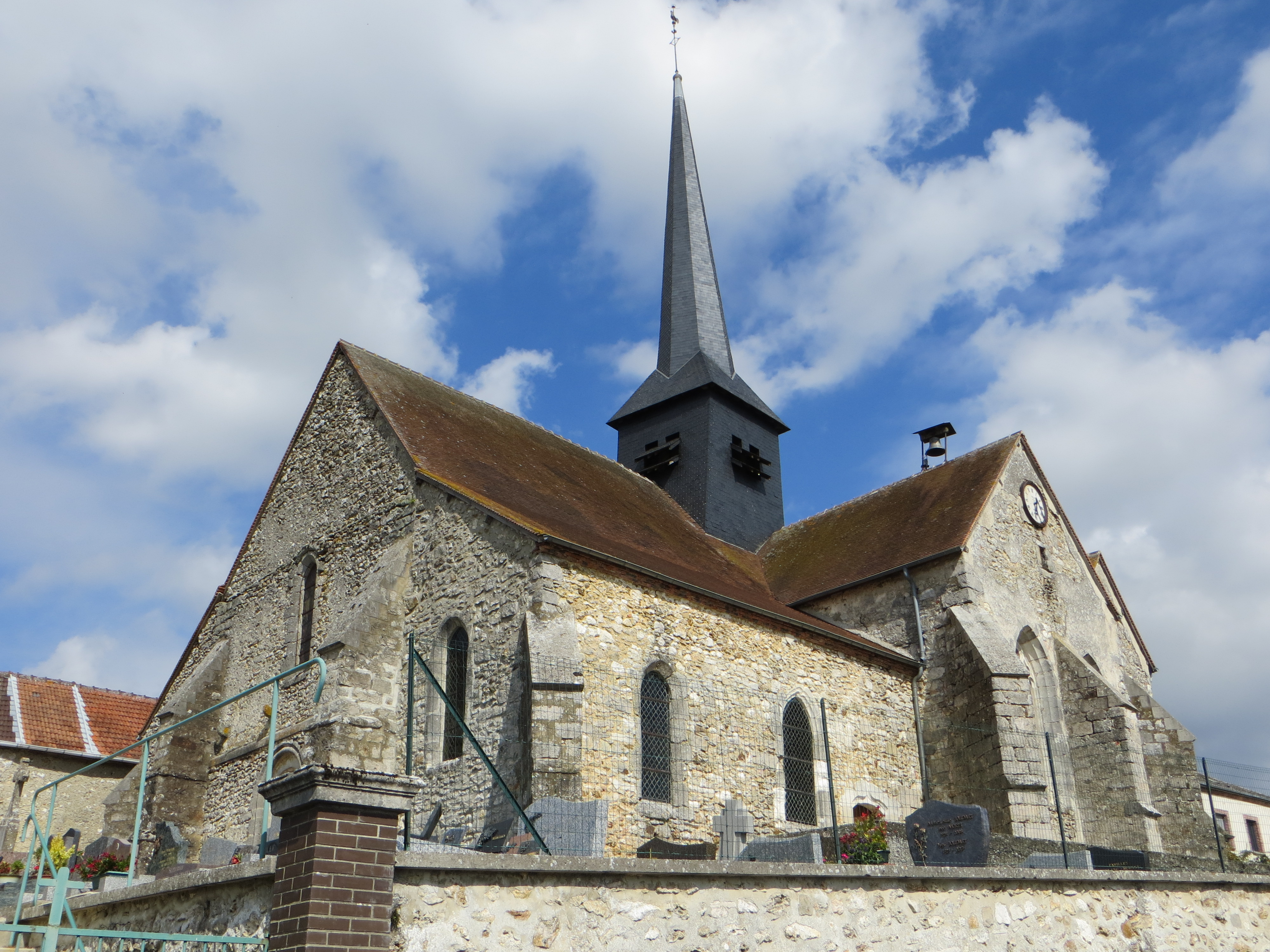
- The church in Fèrebrianges
- Location of Fèrebrianges
- Location within France Location within Grand Est
- Coordinates: 48°52′14″N 3°50′46″E
- Country: France
- Region: Grand Est
- Department: Marne
- Arrondissement: Épernay
- Canton: Dormans-Paysages de Champagne
- Intercommunality: Paysages de la Champagne

Government
  - Mayor (2020–2026): Xavier Duvat
- Area^{1}: 7.19 km^{2} (2.78 sq mi)
- Elevation: 230 m (750 ft)
- Population (2023): 127
  - Density: 17.7/km^{2} (45.7/sq mi)
- Time zone: UTC+01:00 (CET)
  - Summer (DST): UTC+02:00 (CEST)
- INSEE/Postal code: 51247 /51270
- ^{1} French Land Register data, which excludes lakes, ponds, glaciers > 1 km^{2} (0.386 sq mi or 247 acres) and river estuaries.

Fèrebrianges (French pronunciation: [fɛʁbʁijɑ̃ʒ]) is a commune in the Marne department in north-eastern France.

== See also ==
- Communes of the Marne department
