= Olizy =

- Commune
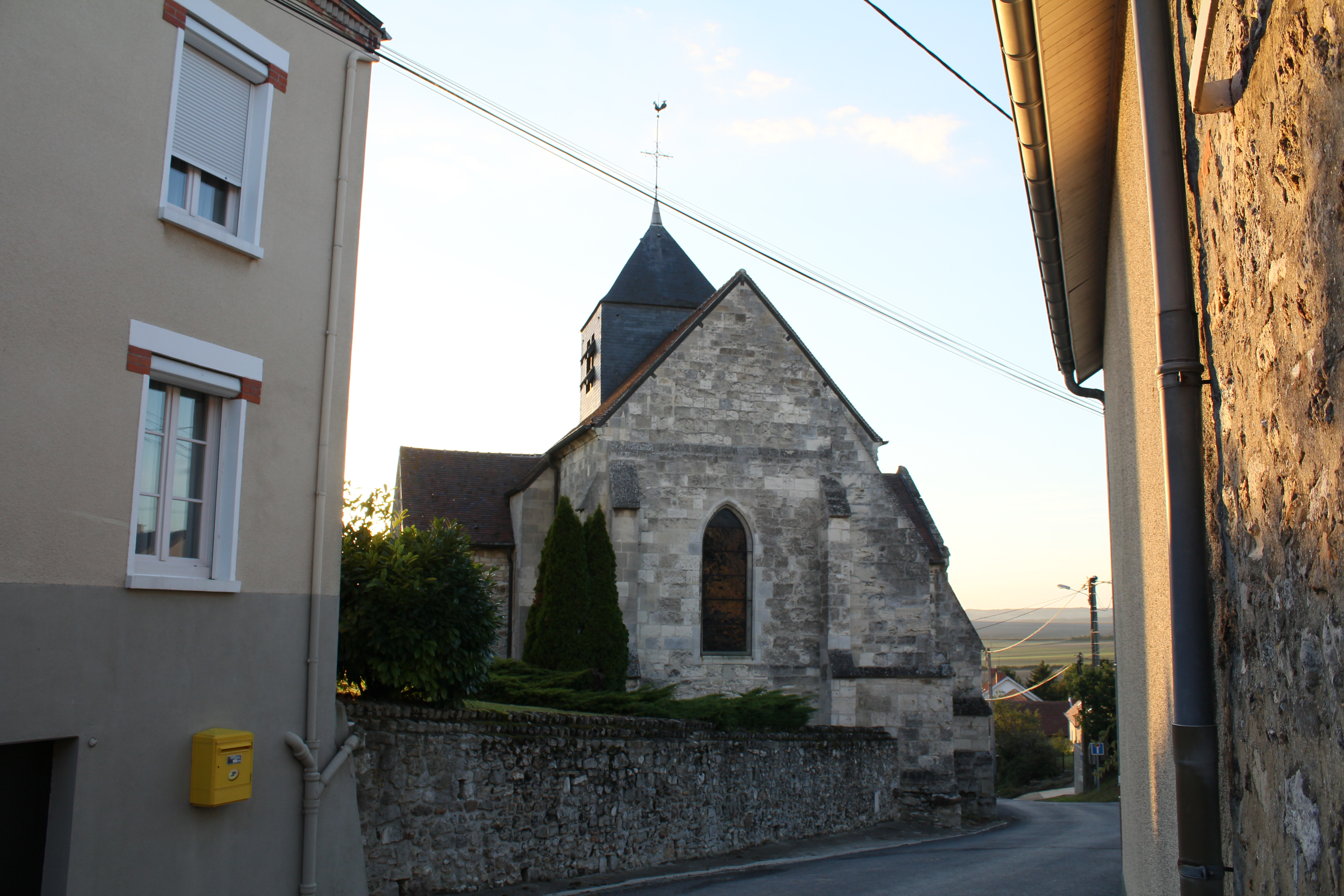
- The church in Olizy
- Location of Olizy
- Location within France Location within Grand Est
- Coordinates: 49°08′52″N 3°45′32″E
- Country: France
- Region: Grand Est
- Department: Marne
- Arrondissement: Reims
- Canton: Dormans-Paysages de Champagne
- Intercommunality: CU Grand Reims

Government
  - Mayor (2020–2026): Jacky Chopin
- Area^{1}: 4.57 km^{2} (1.76 sq mi)
- Elevation: 222 m (728 ft)
- Population (2023): 148
  - Density: 32.4/km^{2} (83.9/sq mi)
- Time zone: UTC+01:00 (CET)
  - Summer (DST): UTC+02:00 (CEST)
- INSEE/Postal code: 51414 /51700
- ^{1} French Land Register data, which excludes lakes, ponds, glaciers > 1 km^{2} (0.386 sq mi or 247 acres) and river estuaries.

Olizy (French pronunciation: [ɔlizi]) is a commune in the Marne department in north-eastern France.

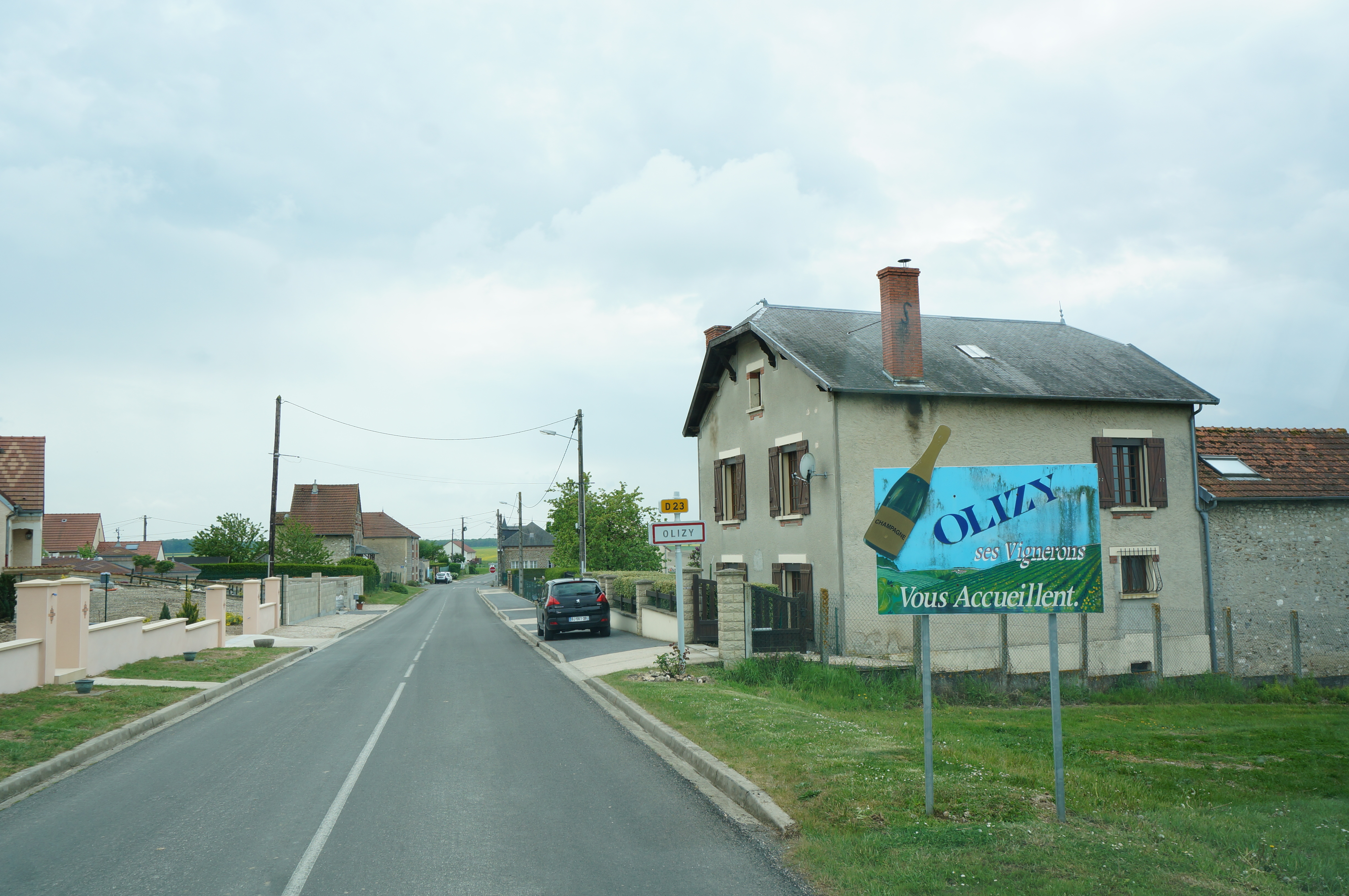
Olizy.

== See also ==
- Communes of the Marne department
