= Vincelles, Marne =

Vincelles
- Commune
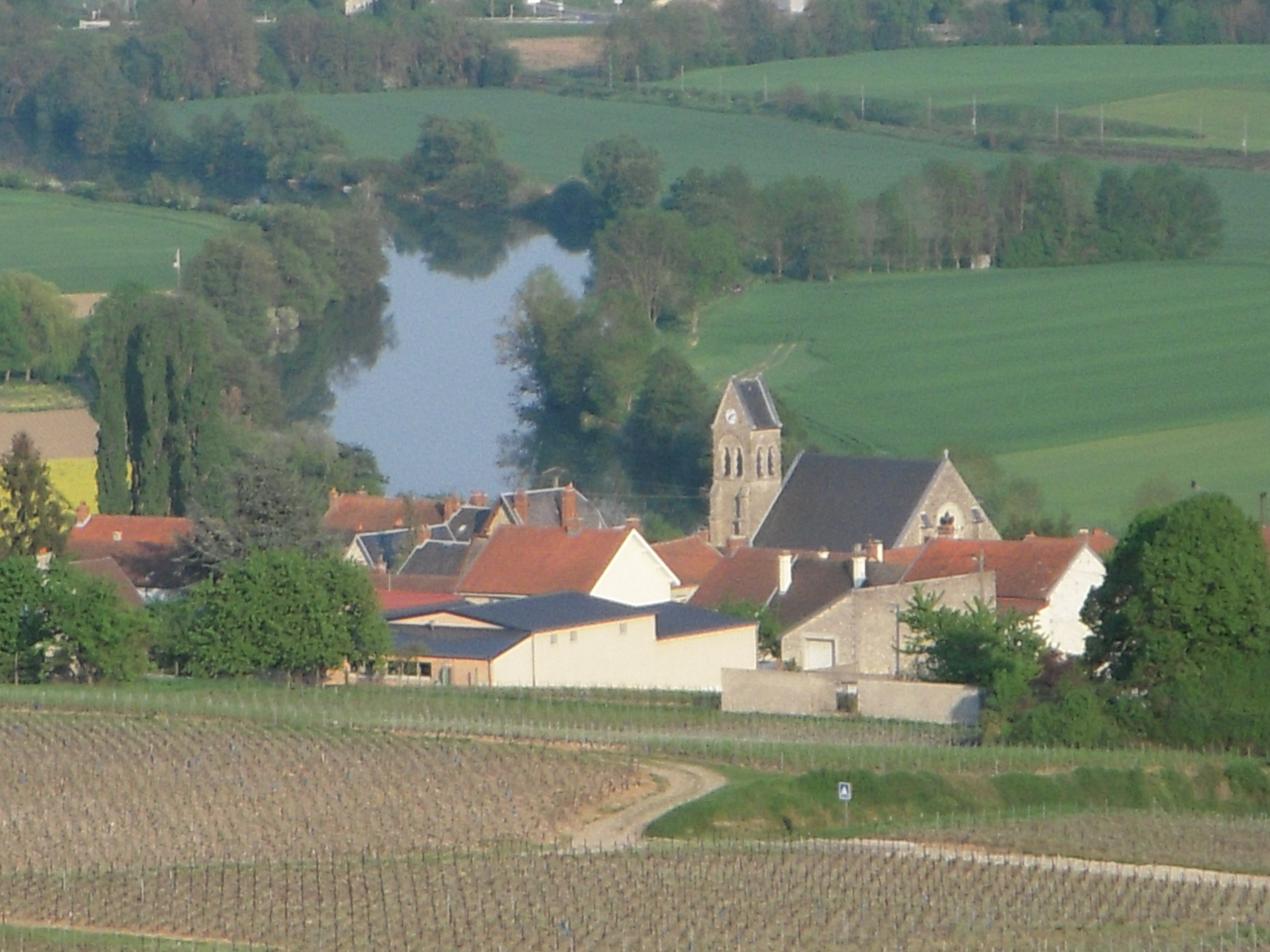
- An aerial view of Vincelles

- Coat of arms
- Location of Vincelles
- Location within France Location within Grand Est
- Coordinates: 49°05′31″N 3°38′32″E
- Country: France
- Region: Grand Est
- Department: Marne
- Arrondissement: Épernay
- Canton: Dormans-Paysages de Champagne
- Intercommunality: Paysages de la Champagne

Government
  - Mayor (2020–2026): Corinne Dépaux
- Area^{1}: 3.55 km^{2} (1.37 sq mi)
- Elevation: 88 m (289 ft)
- Population (2023): 333
  - Density: 93.8/km^{2} (243/sq mi)
- Time zone: UTC+01:00 (CET)
  - Summer (DST): UTC+02:00 (CEST)
- INSEE/Postal code: 51644 /51700
- ^{1} French Land Register data, which excludes lakes, ponds, glaciers > 1 km^{2} (0.386 sq mi or 247 acres) and river estuaries.

Vincelles (French pronunciation: [vɛ̃sɛl]) is a commune in the Marne department in north-eastern France.

== See also ==
- Communes of the Marne department
