= Talus-Saint-Prix =

- Commune
- Location of Talus-Saint-Prix
- Location within France Location within Grand Est
- Coordinates: 48°50′00″N 3°44′48″E
- Country: France
- Region: Grand Est
- Department: Marne
- Arrondissement: Épernay
- Canton: Dormans-Paysages de Champagne
- Intercommunality: Paysages de la Champagne

Government
  - Mayor (2020–2026): Didier Poupinel Descambres
- Area^{1}: 6.2 km^{2} (2.4 sq mi)
- Elevation: 115 m (377 ft)
- Population (2023): 106
  - Density: 17/km^{2} (44/sq mi)
- Time zone: UTC+01:00 (CET)
  - Summer (DST): UTC+02:00 (CEST)
- INSEE/Postal code: 51563 /51270
- ^{1} French Land Register data, which excludes lakes, ponds, glaciers > 1 km^{2} (0.386 sq mi or 247 acres) and river estuaries.

Talus-Saint-Prix is a commune in the Marne department in north-eastern France.

== See also ==
- Communes of the Marne department
