= Suizy-le-Franc =

- Commune
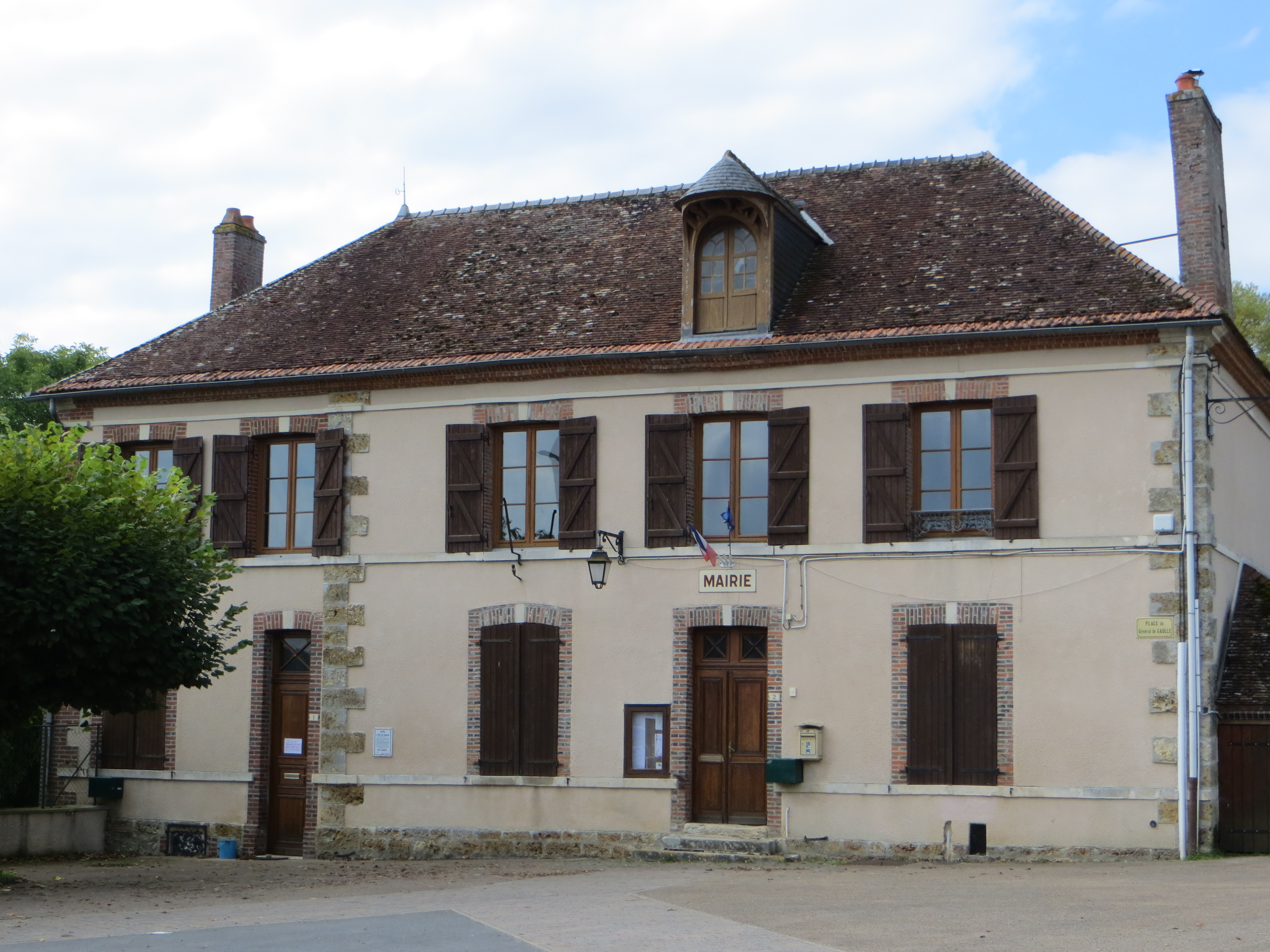
- The town hall in Suizy-le-Franc
- Location of Suizy-le-Franc
- Location within France Location within Grand Est
- Coordinates: 48°57′11″N 3°44′12″E
- Country: France
- Region: Grand Est
- Department: Marne
- Arrondissement: Épernay
- Canton: Dormans-Paysages de Champagne
- Intercommunality: Paysages de la Champagne

Government
  - Mayor (2023–2026): Alain Caillat
- Area^{1}: 6.05 km^{2} (2.34 sq mi)
- Elevation: 191 m (627 ft)
- Population (2023): 107
  - Density: 17.7/km^{2} (45.8/sq mi)
- Time zone: UTC+01:00 (CET)
  - Summer (DST): UTC+02:00 (CEST)
- INSEE/Postal code: 51560 /51270
- ^{1} French Land Register data, which excludes lakes, ponds, glaciers > 1 km^{2} (0.386 sq mi or 247 acres) and river estuaries.

Suizy-le-Franc (French pronunciation: [sɥizi lə fʁɑ̃]) is a commune in the Marne department in north-eastern France.

== See also ==
- Communes of the Marne department
