= La Ville-sous-Orbais =

- Commune
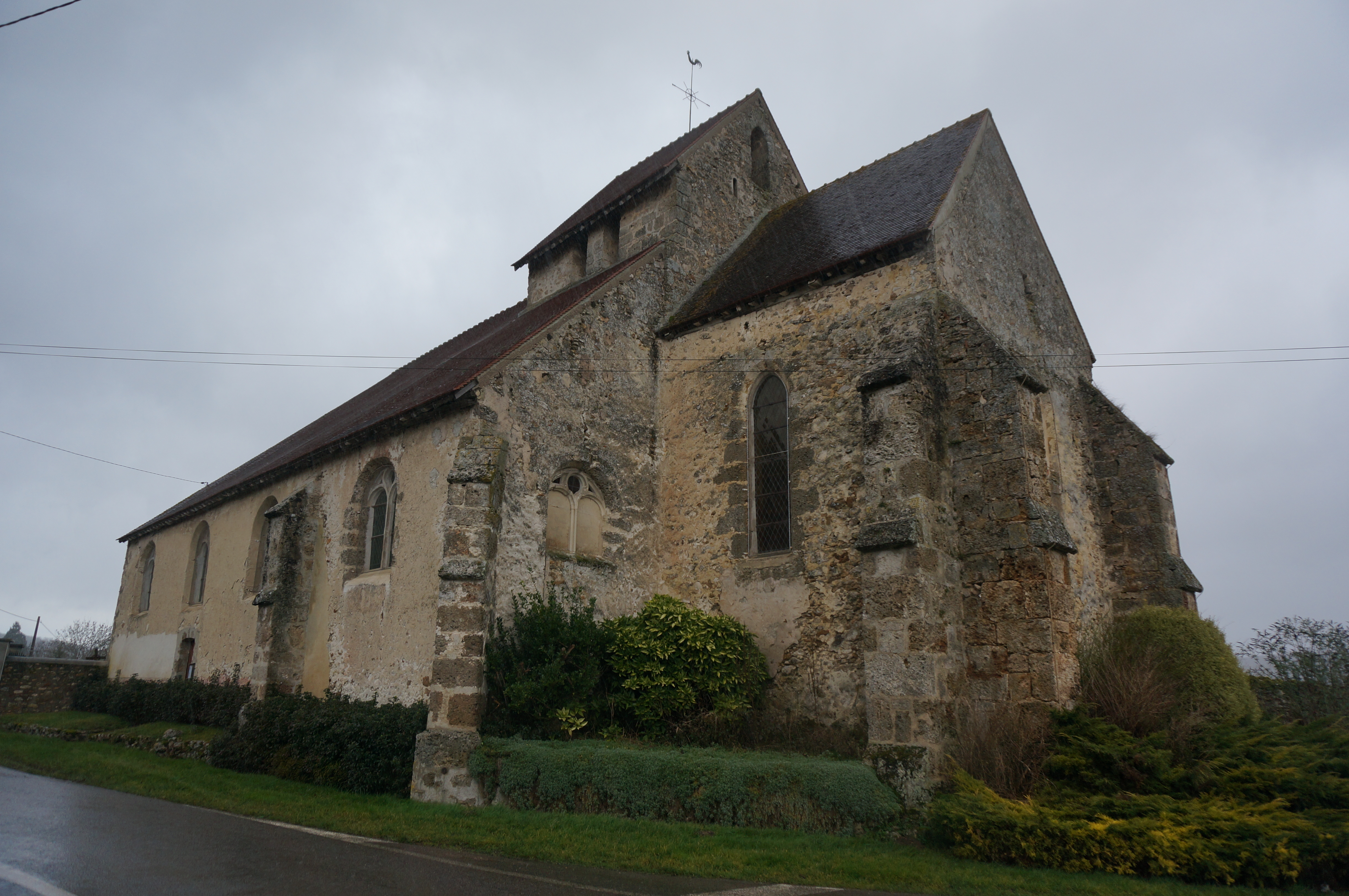
- The church in La Ville-sous-Orbais
- Location of La Ville-sous-Orbais
- Location within France Location within Grand Est
- Coordinates: 48°57′44″N 3°40′47″E
- Country: France
- Region: Grand Est
- Department: Marne
- Arrondissement: Épernay
- Canton: Dormans-Paysages de Champagne
- Intercommunality: Paysages de la Champagne

Government
  - Mayor (2020–2026): Bernard Lisch
- Area^{1}: 11.05 km^{2} (4.27 sq mi)
- Elevation: 137 m (449 ft)
- Population (2023): 41
  - Density: 3.7/km^{2} (9.6/sq mi)
- Time zone: UTC+01:00 (CET)
  - Summer (DST): UTC+02:00 (CEST)
- INSEE/Postal code: 51639 /51270
- ^{1} French Land Register data, which excludes lakes, ponds, glaciers > 1 km^{2} (0.386 sq mi or 247 acres) and river estuaries.

La Ville-sous-Orbais (French pronunciation: [la vil su.z‿ɔʁbɛ]) is a commune in the Marne department in north-eastern France.

== See also ==
- Communes of the Marne department
