= Le Breuil, Marne =

Le Breuil
- Commune
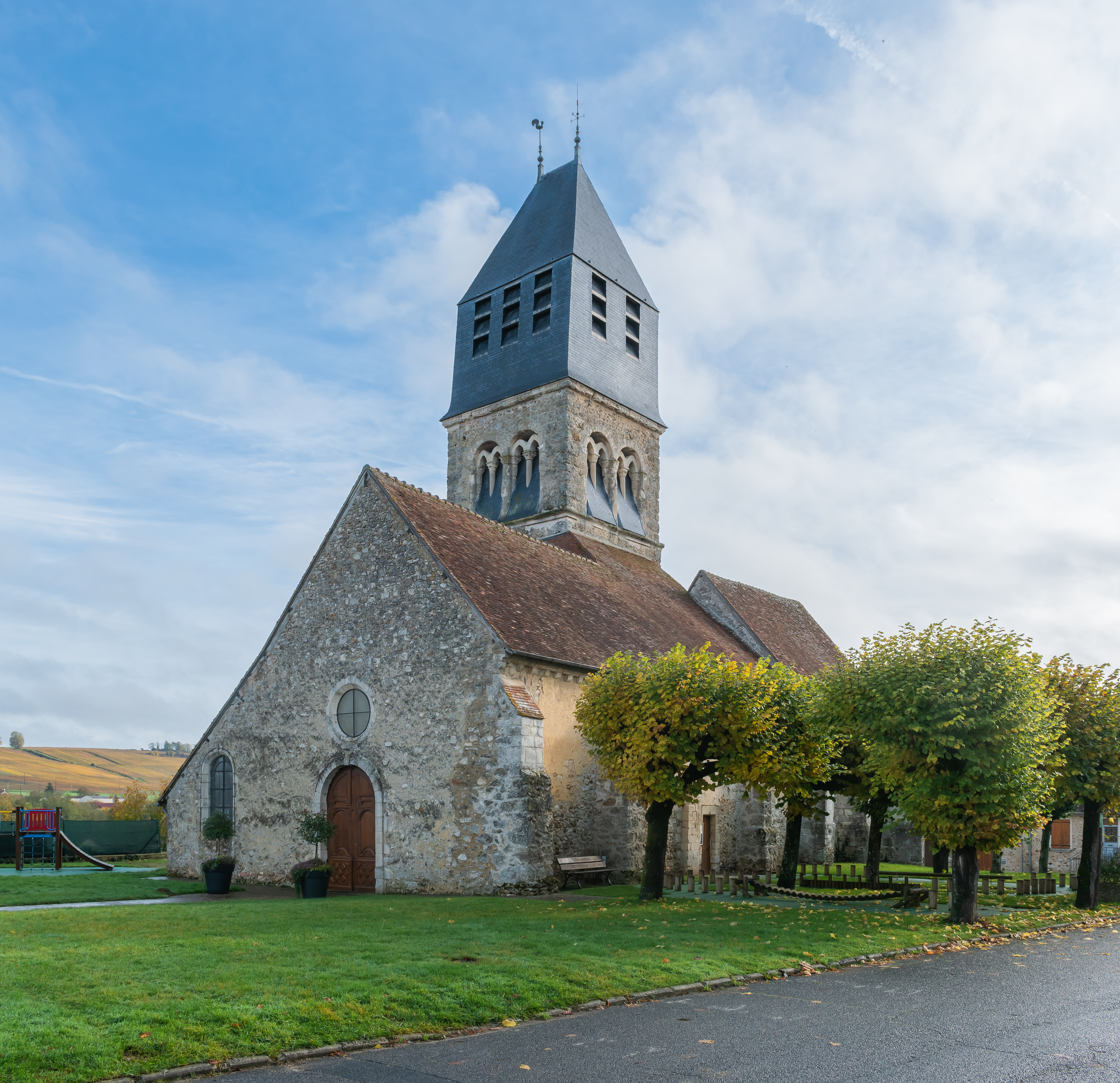
- The church in Le Breuil
- Location of Le Breuil
- Location within France Location within Grand Est
- Coordinates: 48°58′35″N 3°38′51″E
- Country: France
- Region: Grand Est
- Department: Marne
- Arrondissement: Épernay
- Canton: Dormans-Paysages de Champagne

Government
  - Mayor (2020–2026): Didier Dépit
- Area^{1}: 16.01 km^{2} (6.18 sq mi)
- Elevation: 125 m (410 ft)
- Population (2023): 372
  - Density: 23.2/km^{2} (60.2/sq mi)
- Time zone: UTC+01:00 (CET)
  - Summer (DST): UTC+02:00 (CEST)
- INSEE/Postal code: 51085 /51210
- ^{1} French Land Register data, which excludes lakes, ponds, glaciers > 1 km^{2} (0.386 sq mi or 247 acres) and river estuaries.

Le Breuil (French pronunciation: [lə bʁœj]) is a commune in the Marne department in northeastern France.

== Population ==
Historical population
| Year | Pop. | ±% p.a. |
|---|---|---|
| 1968 | 351 | — |
| 1975 | 312 | −1.67% |
| 1982 | 284 | −1.33% |
| 1990 | 327 | +1.78% |
| 1999 | 341 | +0.47% |
| 2007 | 361 | +0.71% |
| 2012 | 410 | +2.58% |
| 2017 | 387 | −1.15% |
| 2023 | 372 | −0.66% |
Source: INSEE

== See also ==
- Communes of the Marne department
