= Lhéry =

- Commune
- Location of Lhéry
- Location within France Location within Grand Est
- Coordinates: 49°12′37″N 3°45′47″E
- Country: France
- Region: Grand Est
- Department: Marne
- Arrondissement: Reims
- Canton: Dormans-Paysages de Champagne
- Intercommunality: CU Grand Reims

Government
  - Mayor (2020–2026): Patricia Durin
- Area^{1}: 6.08 km^{2} (2.35 sq mi)
- Elevation: 174 m (571 ft)
- Population (2023): 89
  - Density: 15/km^{2} (38/sq mi)
- Time zone: UTC+01:00 (CET)
  - Summer (DST): UTC+02:00 (CEST)
- INSEE/Postal code: 51321 /51170
- ^{1} French Land Register data, which excludes lakes, ponds, glaciers > 1 km^{2} (0.386 sq mi or 247 acres) and river estuaries.

Lhéry (French pronunciation: [leʁi]) is a commune in the Marne department in north-eastern France.

== See also ==
- Communes of the Marne department
