= Mareuil-en-Brie =

- Commune
- Location of Mareuil-en-Brie
- Location within France Location within Grand Est
- Coordinates: 48°57′32″N 3°44′40″E
- Country: France
- Region: Grand Est
- Department: Marne
- Arrondissement: Épernay
- Canton: Dormans-Paysages de Champagne
- Intercommunality: Paysages de la Champagne

Government
  - Mayor (2020–2026): José Miguel
- Area^{1}: 8.89 km^{2} (3.43 sq mi)
- Elevation: 213 m (699 ft)
- Population (2023): 288
  - Density: 32.4/km^{2} (83.9/sq mi)
- Time zone: UTC+01:00 (CET)
  - Summer (DST): UTC+02:00 (CEST)
- INSEE/Postal code: 51345 /51270
- ^{1} French Land Register data, which excludes lakes, ponds, glaciers > 1 km^{2} (0.386 sq mi or 247 acres) and river estuaries.

Mareuil-en-Brie (French pronunciation: [maʁœj ɑ̃ bʁi], literally Mareuil in Brie) is a commune in the Marne department in north-eastern France.

== See also ==
- Communes of the Marne department
