= Coizard-Joches =

- Commune
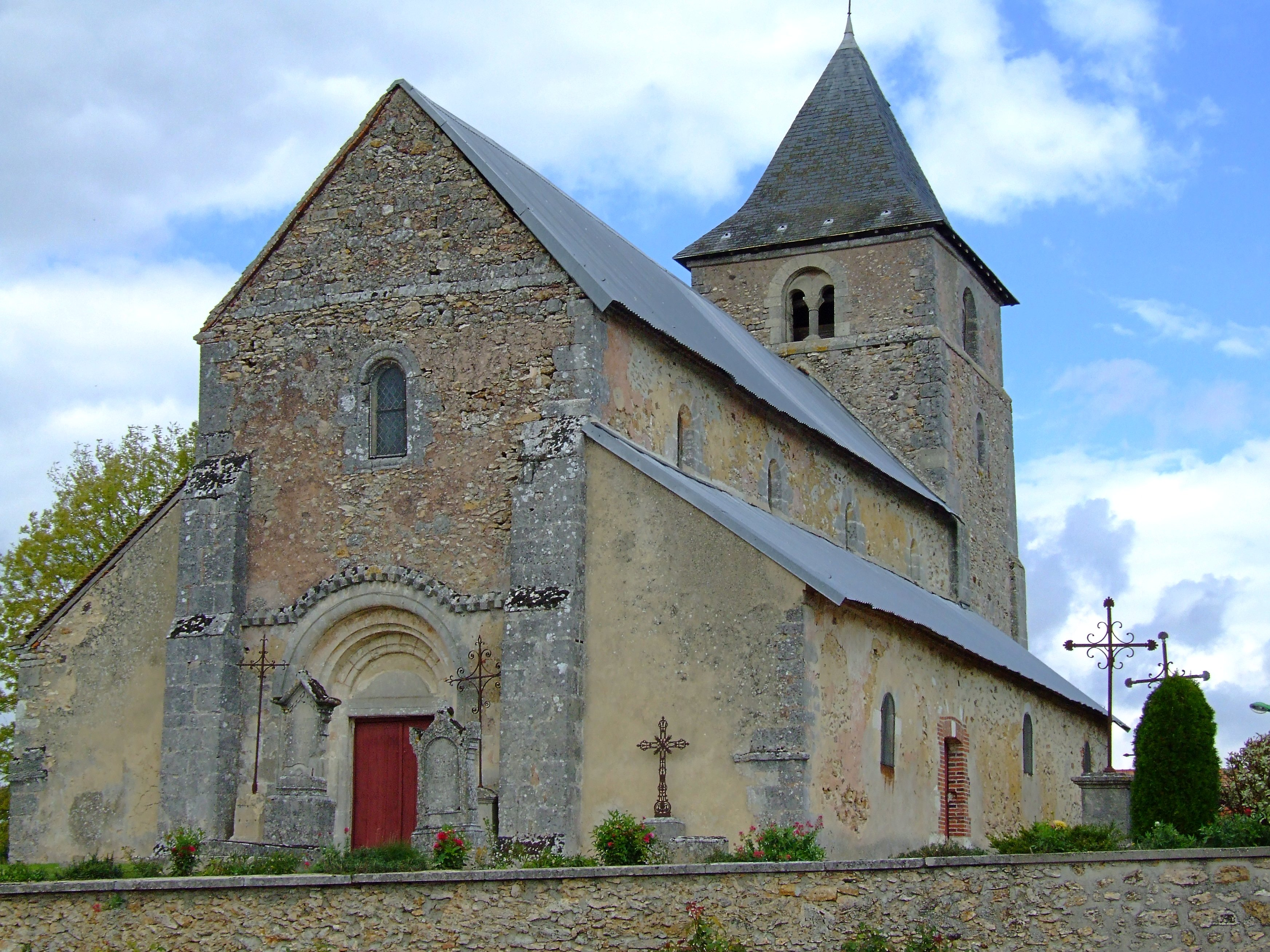
- The church in Coizard
- Location of Coizard-Joches
- Location within France Location within Grand Est
- Coordinates: 48°49′44″N 3°52′00″E
- Country: France
- Region: Grand Est
- Department: Marne
- Arrondissement: Épernay
- Canton: Dormans-Paysages de Champagne
- Intercommunality: Paysages de la Champagne

Government
  - Mayor (2020–2026): Gérard Guyard
- Area^{1}: 10.78 km^{2} (4.16 sq mi)
- Elevation: 280 m (920 ft)
- Population (2023): 94
  - Density: 8.7/km^{2} (23/sq mi)
- Time zone: UTC+01:00 (CET)
  - Summer (DST): UTC+02:00 (CEST)
- INSEE/Postal code: 51157 /51270
- ^{1} French Land Register data, which excludes lakes, ponds, glaciers > 1 km^{2} (0.386 sq mi or 247 acres) and river estuaries.

Coizard-Joches (French pronunciation: [kwazaʁ ʒɔʃ]) is a commune in the Marne department in north-eastern France.

== See also ==
- Communes of the Marne department
