= Villevenard =

- Commune
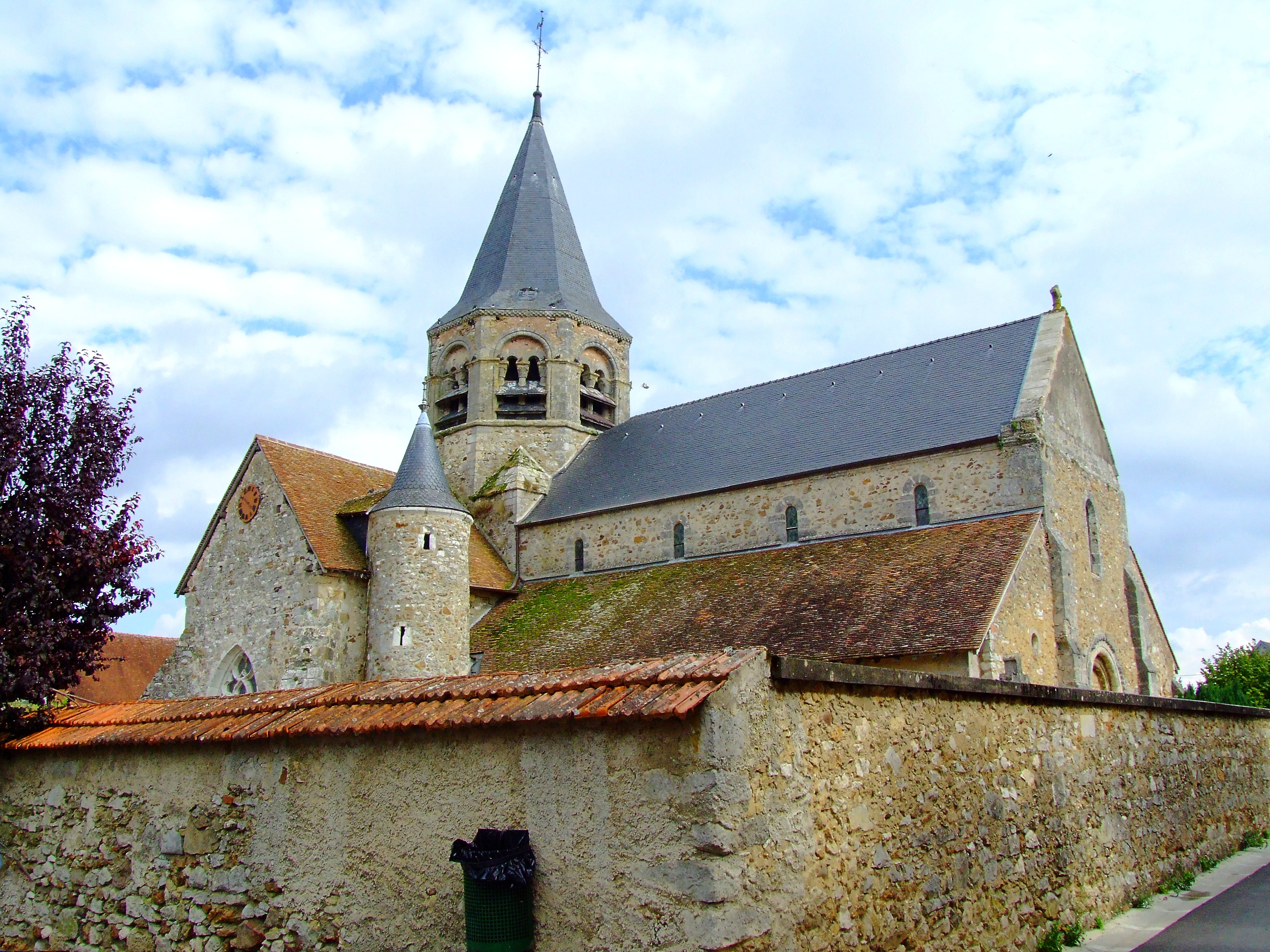
- The church in Villevenard
- Location of Villevenard
- Location within France Location within Grand Est
- Coordinates: 48°49′44″N 3°47′56″E
- Country: France
- Region: Grand Est
- Department: Marne
- Arrondissement: Épernay
- Canton: Dormans-Paysages de Champagne
- Intercommunality: Paysages de la Champagne

Government
  - Mayor (2020–2026): Sylvie Pietrement
- Area^{1}: 13.28 km^{2} (5.13 sq mi)
- Elevation: 112 m (367 ft)
- Population (2023): 193
  - Density: 14.5/km^{2} (37.6/sq mi)
- Time zone: UTC+01:00 (CET)
  - Summer (DST): UTC+02:00 (CEST)
- INSEE/Postal code: 51641 /51270
- ^{1} French Land Register data, which excludes lakes, ponds, glaciers > 1 km^{2} (0.386 sq mi or 247 acres) and river estuaries.

Villevenard (French pronunciation: [vilvənaʁ]) is a commune in the Marne department in north-eastern France.

== See also ==
- Communes of the Marne department
