= Angluzelles-et-Courcelles =

- Commune
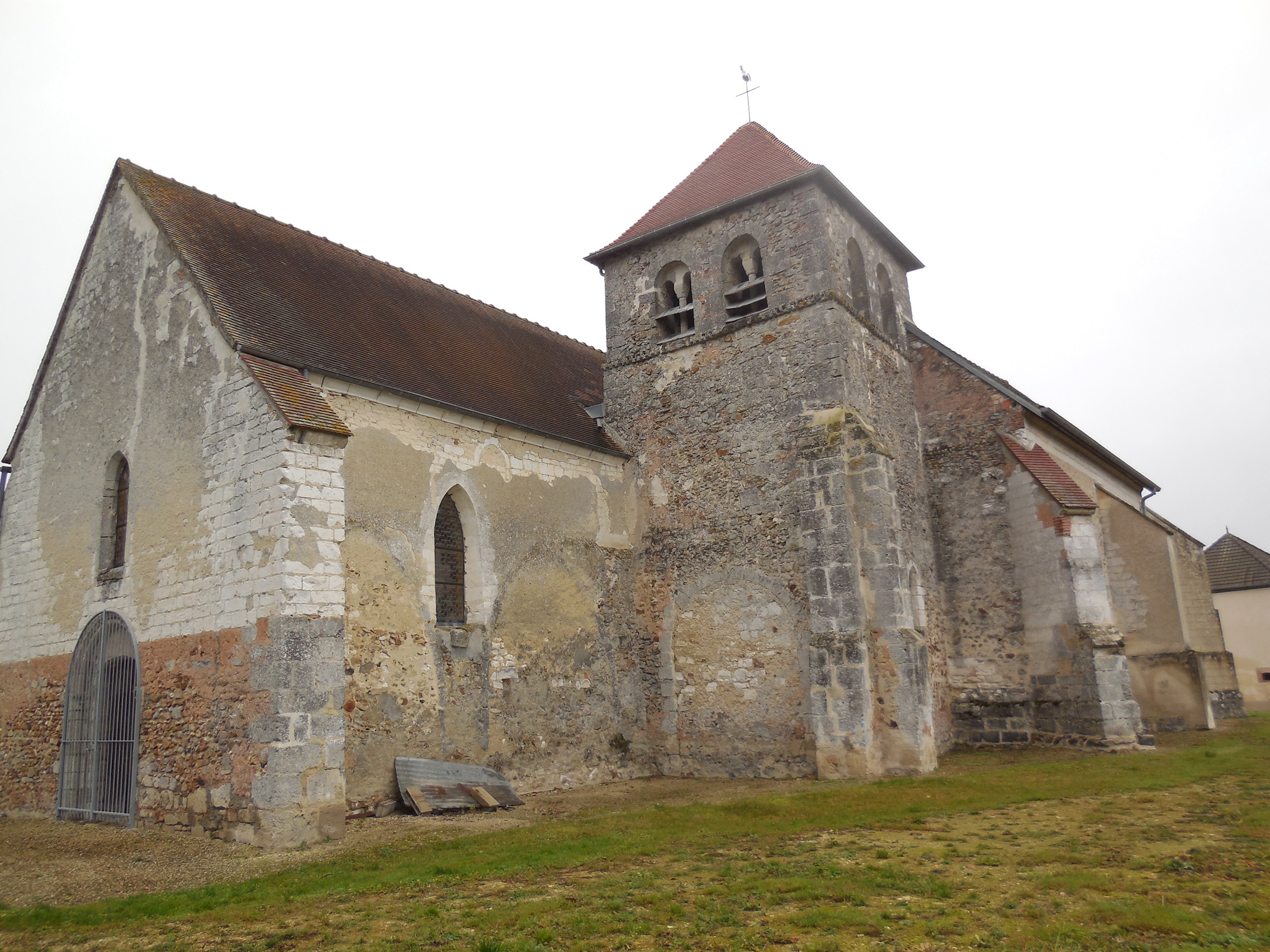
- The church in Angluzelles
- Location of Angluzelles-et-Courcelles
- Location within France Location within Grand Est
- Coordinates: 48°39′35″N 3°52′49″E
- Country: France
- Region: Grand Est
- Department: Marne
- Arrondissement: Épernay
- Canton: Vertus-Plaine Champenoise
- Intercommunality: Sud Marnais

Government
  - Mayor (2020–2026): Alexandre Séguiniol
- Area^{1}: 13.7 km^{2} (5.3 sq mi)
- Elevation: 93 m (305 ft)
- Population (2023): 149
  - Density: 10.9/km^{2} (28.2/sq mi)
- Time zone: UTC+01:00 (CET)
  - Summer (DST): UTC+02:00 (CEST)
- INSEE/Postal code: 51010 /51230
- ^{1} French Land Register data, which excludes lakes, ponds, glaciers > 1 km^{2} (0.386 sq mi or 247 acres) and river estuaries.

Angluzelles-et-Courcelles (French pronunciation: [ɑ̃ɡlyzɛl e kuʁsɛl]) is a commune in the Marne department in northeastern France.

== Geography ==
Angluzelles-et-Courcelles is in the south-west of the Marne department. It is 45 km north of Troyes and 75 km south of Reims. It is composed of Angluzelles in the west, and Courcelles in the east. The commune is bordered by the communes of Marigny, Thaas, Faux-Fresnay, Corroy, Ognes, and Pleurs.

== Politics ==
Mayors before 1901
Term as mayor	Name
	Denis Noblot
?-1796	Joseph Besset
1796-1798	Joseph Danton
1798-1806	Pierre Guillemot
1806-1820	Vincent Savinien Coffinet
1820-1871	Pierre Dominique Guillemot
1871-1876	Pierre Gabriel Fossoyeux
1876-1878	Gabriel Billebaut
1878-1888	Pierre Gabriel Fossoyeux
1888	Parre Désiré Vry
1888-1896	Joseph Julien Mangin
1896-1901	Gabriel Fossoyeux

Mayors after 2001
Term	Name
2001–2020	Jean-François Courjan
2020–present	Alexandre Séguiniol

== Population ==
Historical population
Year	Pop.	±% p.a.
1968	152	—
1975	137	−1.47%
1982	137	+0.00%
1990	140	+0.27%
1999	143	+0.24%
2007	137	−0.53%
2012	144	+1.00%
2017	146	+0.28%
2023	149	+0.34%
Source: INSEE

== See also ==
- Communes of the Marne department
