= Arrondissement of Épernay =

Coordinates: 49°02′N 3°57′E

Épernay
- Arrondissement
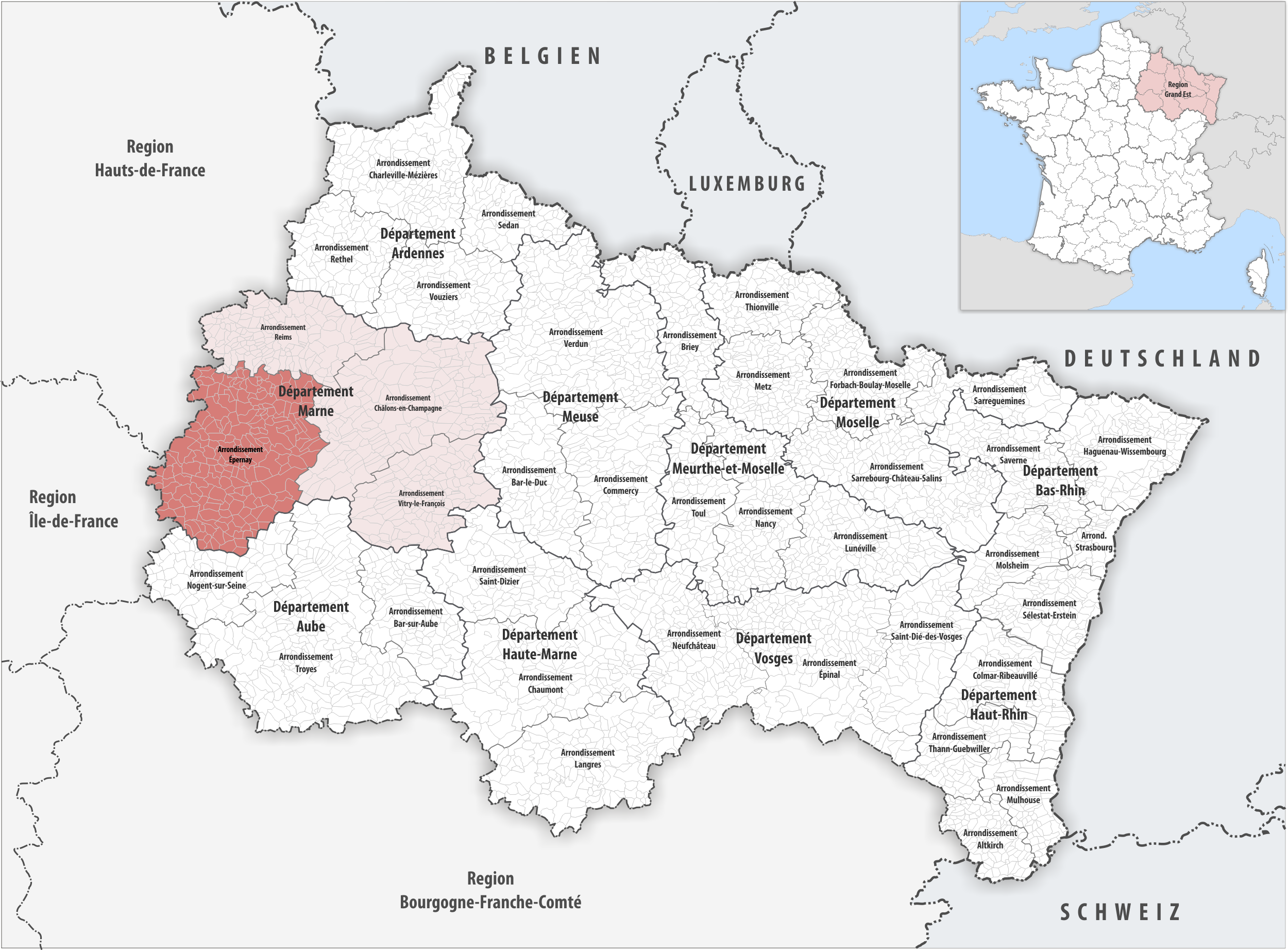
- Location within the region Grand Est
- Country: France
- Region: Grand Est
- Department: Marne
- No. of communes: {{{nbcomm}}}
- Area: 2,722.4 km^{2} (1,051.1 sq mi)
- Population (2023): 115,463
  - Density: 42.412/km^{2} (109.85/sq mi)
- INSEE code: 512

The arrondissement of Épernay is an arrondissement of France in the Marne department in the Grand Est region. It has 208 communes. Its population is 116,465 (2021), and its area is 2,722.4 km^{2} (1,051.1 sq mi).

== Composition ==
The communes of the arrondissement of Épernay, and their INSEE codes, are:

1. Allemanche-Launay-et-Soyer (51004)
2. Allemant (51005)
3. Ambonnay (51007)
4. Anglure (51009)
5. Angluzelles-et-Courcelles (51010)
6. Athis (51018)
7. Avenay-Val-d'Or (51028)
8. Avize (51029)
9. Aÿ-Champagne (51030)
10. Bagneux (51032)
11. Le Baizil (51033)
12. Bannay (51034)
13. Bannes (51035)
14. Barbonne-Fayel (51036)
15. Baslieux-sous-Châtillon (51038)
16. Baudement (51041)
17. Baye (51042)
18. Beaunay (51045)
19. Belval-sous-Châtillon (51048)
20. Bergères-lès-Vertus (51049)
21. Bergères-sous-Montmirail (51050)
22. Bethon (51056)
23. Blancs-Coteaux (51612)
24. Boissy-le-Repos (51070)
25. Bouchy-Saint-Genest (51071)
26. Boursault (51076)
27. Bouzy (51079)
28. Le Breuil (51085)
29. Broussy-le-Grand (51090)
30. Broussy-le-Petit (51091)
31. Broyes (51092)
32. Brugny-Vaudancourt (51093)
33. La Caure (51100)
34. La Celle-sous-Chantemerle (51103)
35. Chaintrix-Bierges (51107)
36. Chaltrait (51110)
37. Champaubert (51113)
38. Champguyon (51116)
39. Champillon (51119)
40. Champlat-et-Boujacourt (51120)
41. Champvoisy (51121)
42. Chantemerle (51124)
43. La Chapelle-Lasson (51127)
44. La Chapelle-sous-Orbais (51128)
45. Charleville (51129)
46. Châtillon-sur-Marne (51136)
47. Châtillon-sur-Morin (51137)
48. Chavot-Courcourt (51142)
49. Chichey (51151)
50. Chouilly (51153)
51. Clamanges (51154)
52. Clesles (51155)
53. Cœur-de-la-Vallée (51457)
54. Coizard-Joches (51157)
55. Conflans-sur-Seine (51162)
56. Congy (51163)
57. Connantray-Vaurefroy (51164)
58. Connantre (51165)
59. Corfélix (51170)
60. Cormoyeux (51173)
61. Corribert (51174)
62. Corrobert (51175)
63. Corroy (51176)
64. Courcemain (51182)
65. Courgivaux (51185)
66. Courjeonnet (51186)
67. Courthiézy (51192)
68. Cramant (51196)
69. Cuchery (51199)
70. Cuis (51200)
71. Cumières (51202)
72. Damery (51204)
73. Dizy (51210)
74. Dormans (51217)
75. Écury-le-Repos (51226)
76. Épernay (51230)
77. Escardes (51233)
78. Esclavolles-Lurey (51234)
79. Les Essarts-le-Vicomte (51236)
80. Les Essarts-lès-Sézanne (51235)
81. Esternay (51237)
82. Étoges (51238)
83. Étréchy (51239)
84. Euvy (51241)
85. Faux-Fresnay (51243)
86. Fère-Champenoise (51248)
87. Fèrebrianges (51247)
88. Festigny (51249)
89. Flavigny (51251)
90. Fleury-la-Rivière (51252)
91. Fontaine-Denis-Nuisy (51254)
92. Fontaine-sur-Ay (51256)
93. La Forestière (51258)
94. Fromentières (51263)
95. Le Gault-Soigny (51264)
96. Gaye (51265)
97. Germaine (51266)
98. Germinon (51268)
99. Givry-lès-Loisy (51273)
100. Gourgançon (51276)
101. Granges-sur-Aube (51279)
102. Grauves (51281)
103. Hautvillers (51287)
104. Igny-Comblizy (51298)
105. Les Istres-et-Bury (51302)
106. Janvilliers (51304)
107. Joiselle (51306)
108. Lachy (51313)
109. Leuvrigny (51320)
110. Linthelles (51323)
111. Linthes (51324)
112. Loisy-en-Brie (51327)
113. Magenta (51663)
114. Mancy (51342)
115. Marcilly-sur-Seine (51343)
116. Mardeuil (51344)
117. Mareuil-en-Brie (51345)
118. Mareuil-le-Port (51346)
119. Margny (51350)
120. Marigny (51351)
121. Marsangis (51353)
122. Mécringes (51359)
123. Le Meix-Saint-Epoing (51360)
124. Le Mesnil-sur-Oger (51367)
125. Mondement-Montgivroux (51374)
126. Montgenost (51376)
127. Monthelon (51378)
128. Montmirail (51380)
129. Montmort-Lucy (51381)
130. Morangis (51384)
131. Morsains (51386)
132. Moslins (51387)
133. Moussy (51390)
134. Mutigny (51392)
135. Mœurs-Verdey (51369)
136. Nanteuil-la-Forêt (51393)
137. Nesle-la-Reposte (51395)
138. Nesle-le-Repons (51396)
139. La Neuville-aux-Larris (51398)
140. Neuvy (51402)
141. La Noue (51407)
142. Œuilly (51410)
143. Ognes (51412)
144. Oiry (51413)
145. Orbais-l'Abbaye (51416)
146. Oyes (51421)
147. Passy-Grigny (51425)
148. Péas (51426)
149. Pierre-Morains (51430)
150. Pierry (51431)
151. Pleurs (51432)
152. Plivot (51434)
153. Pocancy (51435)
154. Potangis (51443)
155. Queudes (51451)
156. Reuves (51458)
157. Réveillon (51459)
158. Rieux (51460)
159. Romery (51465)
160. Rouffy (51469)
161. Saint-Bon (51473)
162. Sainte-Gemme (51480)
163. Saint-Imoges (51488)
164. Saint-Just-Sauvage (51492)
165. Saint-Loup (51495)
166. Saint-Mard-lès-Rouffy (51499)
167. Saint-Martin-d'Ablois (51002)
168. Saint-Quentin-le-Verger (51511)
169. Saint-Remy-sous-Broyes (51514)
170. Saint-Saturnin (51516)
171. Saron-sur-Aube (51524)
172. Saudoy (51526)
173. Sézanne (51535)
174. Soizy-aux-Bois (51542)
175. Soulières (51558)
176. Suizy-le-Franc (51560)
177. Talus-Saint-Prix (51563)
178. Thaas (51565)
179. Le Thoult-Trosnay (51570)
180. Tours-sur-Marne (51576)
181. Trécon (51578)
182. Tréfols (51579)
183. Troissy (51585)
184. Val-de-Livre (51564)
185. Val-des-Marais (51158)
186. Vandières (51592)
187. Vauchamps (51596)
188. Vauciennes (51597)
189. Vélye (51603)
190. Venteuil (51605)
191. Verdon (51607)
192. Verneuil (51609)
193. Vert-Toulon (51611)
194. Le Vézier (51618)
195. Villeneuve-la-Lionne (51625)
196. Villeneuve-Saint-Vistre-et-Villevotte (51628)
197. Villers-aux-Bois (51630)
198. La Ville-sous-Orbais (51639)
199. La Villeneuve-lès-Charleville (51626)
200. Villeneuve-Renneville-Chevigny (51627)
201. Villeseneux (51638)
202. Villevenard (51641)
203. Villiers-aux-Corneilles (51642)
204. Vinay (51643)
205. Vincelles (51644)
206. Vindey (51645)
207. Vouarces (51652)
208. Vouzy (51655)

== History ==
The arrondissement of Épernay was created in 1800. In January 2006 it absorbed the canton of Ay from the arrondissement of Reims. At the April 2017 reorganisation of the arrondissements of Marne, it gained 23 communes from the arrondissement of Châlons-en-Champagne and 13 communes from the arrondissement of Reims, and it lost four communes to the arrondissement of Châlons-en-Champagne.

As a result of the reorganisation of the cantons of France which came into effect in 2015, the borders of the cantons are no longer related to the borders of the arrondissements. The cantons of the arrondissement of Épernay were, as of January 2015:

1. Anglure
2. Avize
3. Ay
4. Dormans
5. Épernay-1
6. Épernay-2
7. Esternay
8. Fère-Champenoise
9. Montmirail
10. Montmort-Lucy
11. Sézanne
