= Connantre =

- Commune
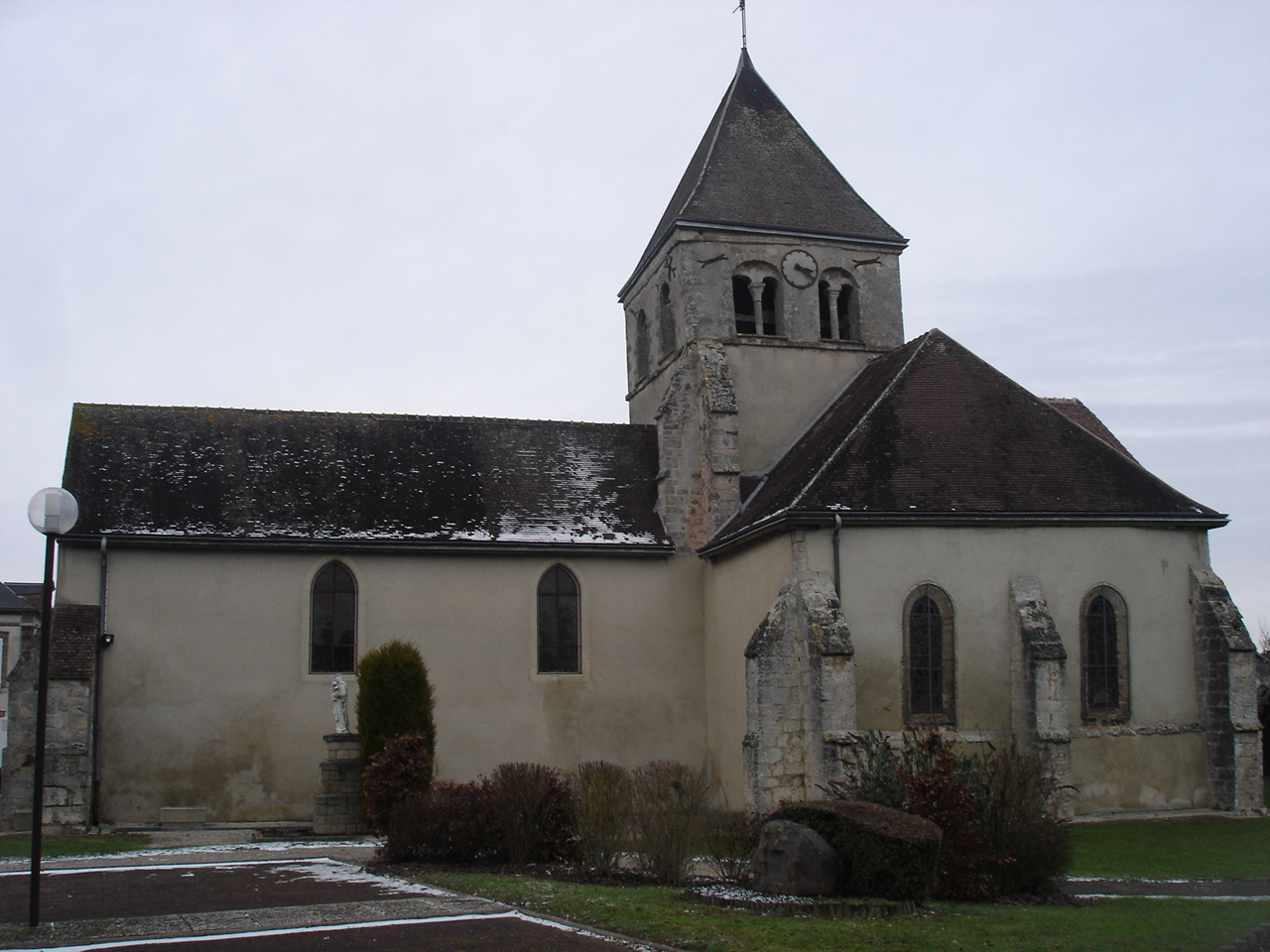
- The church in Connantre

- Coat of arms
- Location of Connantre
- Location within France Location within Grand Est
- Coordinates: 48°43′33″N 3°55′19″E
- Country: France
- Region: Grand Est
- Department: Marne
- Arrondissement: Épernay
- Canton: Vertus-Plaine Champenoise

Government
  - Mayor (2020–2026): Michel Jacob
- Area^{1}: 28.55 km^{2} (11.02 sq mi)
- Elevation: 98 m (322 ft)
- Population (2023): 1,011
  - Density: 35.41/km^{2} (91.72/sq mi)
- Time zone: UTC+01:00 (CET)
  - Summer (DST): UTC+02:00 (CEST)
- INSEE/Postal code: 51165 /51230
- ^{1} French Land Register data, which excludes lakes, ponds, glaciers > 1 km^{2} (0.386 sq mi or 247 acres) and river estuaries.

Connantre (French pronunciation: [kɔnɑ̃tʁ]) is a commune in the Marne department in north-eastern France.

== See also ==
- Communes of the Marne department
