= Bannes, Marne =

Bannes
- Commune
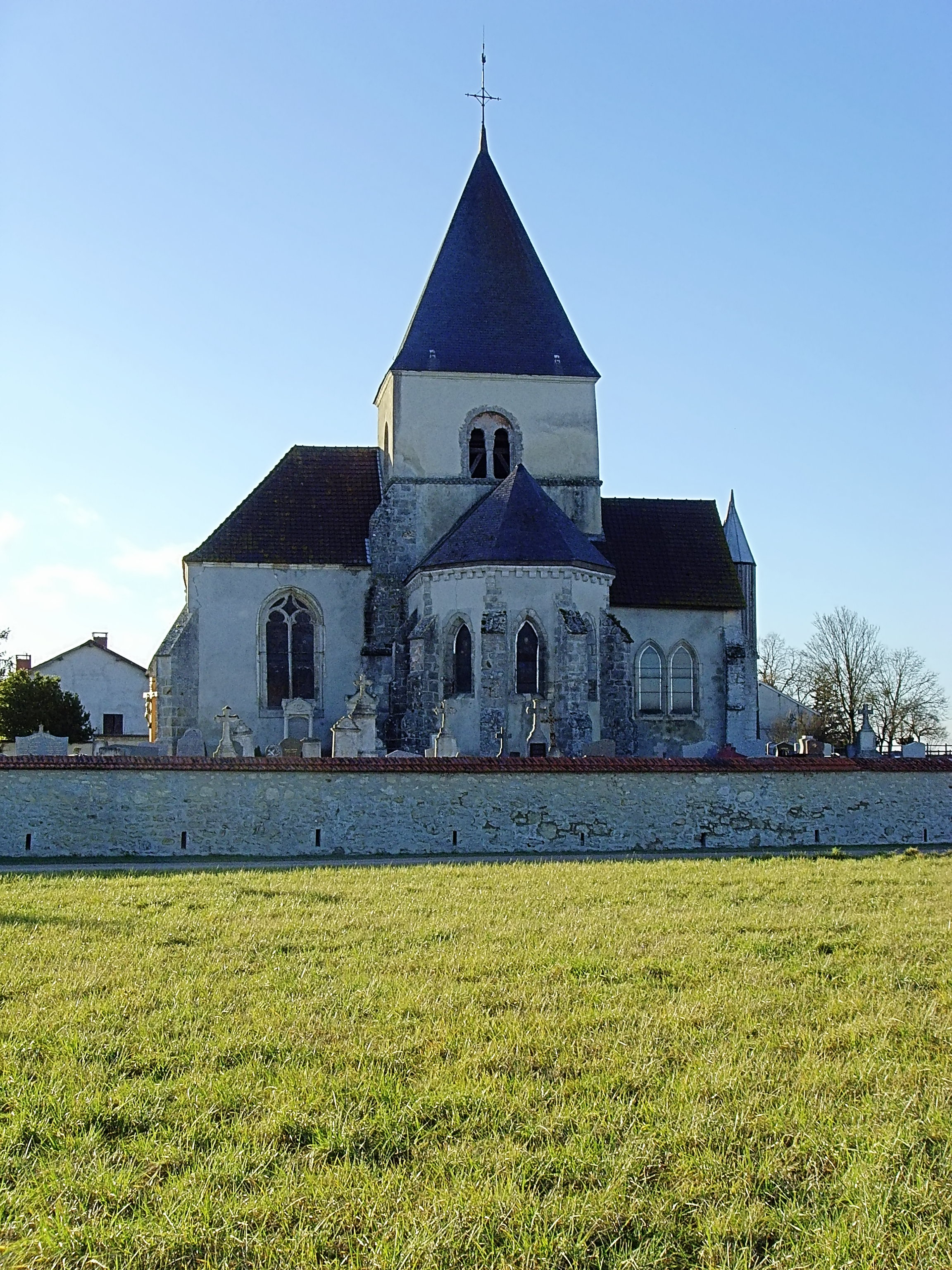
- The church in Bannes
- Location of Bannes
- Location within France Location within Grand Est
- Coordinates: 48°48′12″N 3°55′10″E
- Country: France
- Region: Grand Est
- Department: Marne
- Arrondissement: Épernay
- Canton: Vertus-Plaine Champenoise
- Intercommunality: Sud Marnais

Government
  - Mayor (2022–2026): Armelle Sauvage
- Area^{1}: 23.33 km^{2} (9.01 sq mi)
- Elevation: 168 m (551 ft)
- Population (2023): 252
  - Density: 10.8/km^{2} (28.0/sq mi)
- Time zone: UTC+01:00 (CET)
  - Summer (DST): UTC+02:00 (CEST)
- INSEE/Postal code: 51035 /51230
- ^{1} French Land Register data, which excludes lakes, ponds, glaciers > 1 km^{2} (0.386 sq mi or 247 acres) and river estuaries.

Bannes (French pronunciation: [ban]) is a commune in the Marne department in northeastern France.

== Population ==
Historical population
Year	Pop.	±% p.a.
1968	271	—
1975	230	−2.32%
1982	224	−0.38%
1990	204	−1.16%
1999	212	+0.43%
2007	258	+2.49%
2012	282	+1.79%
2017	273	−0.65%
2023	252	−1.33%
Source: INSEE

== See also ==
- Communes of the Marne department
