= Courcemain =

- Commune
- Location of Courcemain
- Location within France Location within Grand Est
- Coordinates: 48°37′05″N 3°55′13″E
- Country: France
- Region: Grand Est
- Department: Marne
- Arrondissement: Épernay
- Canton: Vertus-Plaine Champenoise

Government
  - Mayor (2023–2026): Gérard Lebrun
- Area^{1}: 9.96 km^{2} (3.85 sq mi)
- Elevation: 83 m (272 ft)
- Population (2023): 95
  - Density: 9.5/km^{2} (25/sq mi)
- Time zone: UTC+01:00 (CET)
  - Summer (DST): UTC+02:00 (CEST)
- INSEE/Postal code: 51182 /51260
- ^{1} French Land Register data, which excludes lakes, ponds, glaciers > 1 km^{2} (0.386 sq mi or 247 acres) and river estuaries.

Courcemain (French pronunciation: [kuʁsəmɛ̃]) is a commune in the Marne department in north-eastern France.

== See also ==
- Communes of the Marne department
