= Villiers-aux-Corneilles =

- Commune
- Location of Villiers-aux-Corneilles
- Location within France Location within Grand Est
- Coordinates: 48°34′34″N 3°40′47″E
- Country: France
- Region: Grand Est
- Department: Marne
- Arrondissement: Épernay
- Canton: Vertus-Plaine Champenoise
- Intercommunality: Sézanne-Sud Ouest Marnais

Government
  - Mayor (2020–2026): Hervé Moreau
- Area^{1}: 5.88 km^{2} (2.27 sq mi)
- Elevation: 81 m (266 ft)
- Population (2023): 113
  - Density: 19.2/km^{2} (49.8/sq mi)
- Time zone: UTC+01:00 (CET)
  - Summer (DST): UTC+02:00 (CEST)
- INSEE/Postal code: 51642 /51260
- ^{1} French Land Register data, which excludes lakes, ponds, glaciers > 1 km^{2} (0.386 sq mi or 247 acres) and river estuaries.

Villiers-aux-Corneilles (French pronunciation: [vilje o kɔʁnɛj]) is a commune in the Marne department in north-eastern France.

== See also ==
- Communes of the Marne department
