= Connantray-Vaurefroy =

- Commune
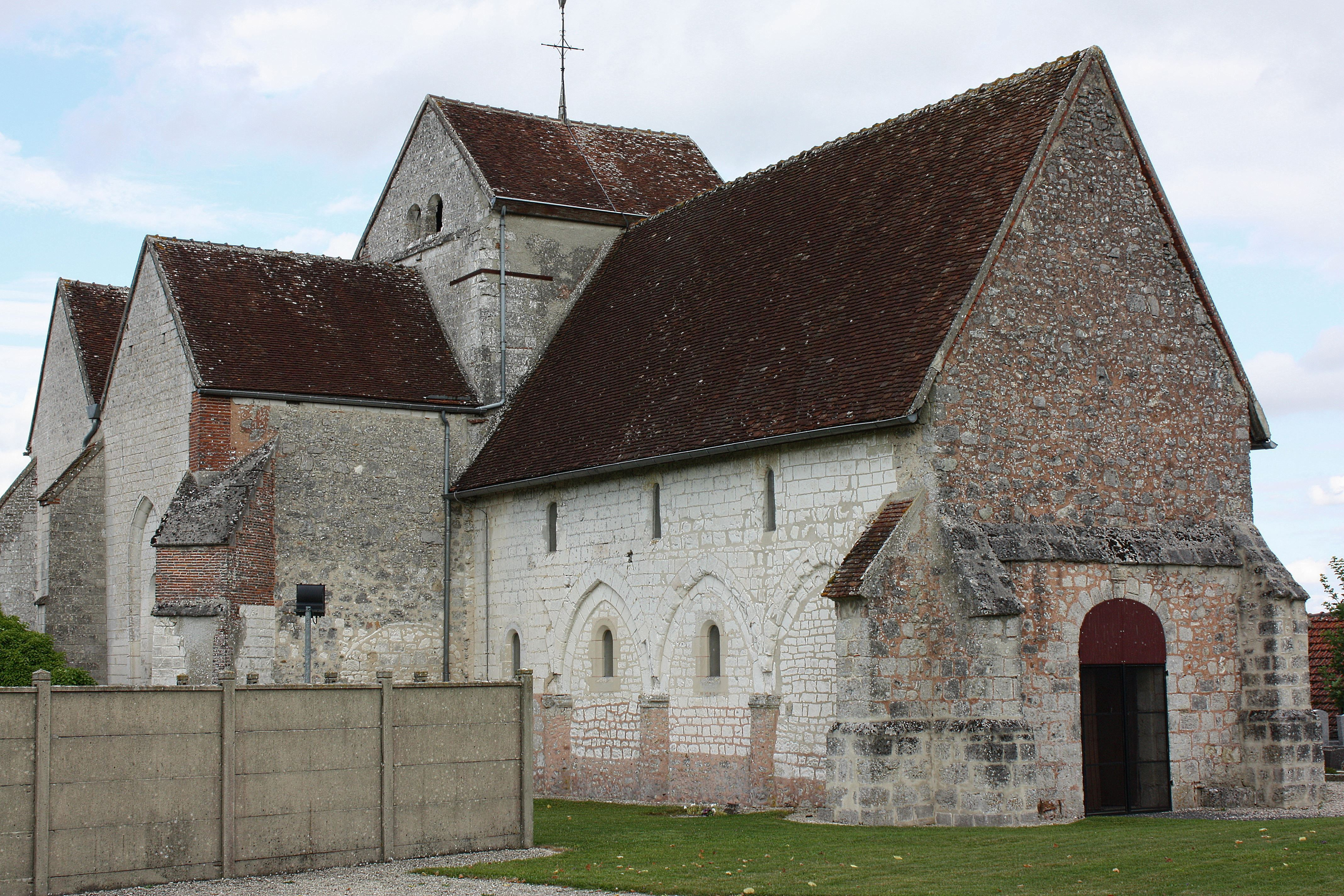
- The church in Connantray
- Location of Connantray-Vaurefroy
- Location within France Location within Grand Est
- Coordinates: 48°44′53″N 4°03′45″E
- Country: France
- Region: Grand Est
- Department: Marne
- Arrondissement: Épernay
- Canton: Vertus-Plaine Champenoise
- Intercommunality: Sud Marnais

Government
  - Mayor (2020–2026): Thierry Mathellié
- Area^{1}: 28.83 km^{2} (11.13 sq mi)
- Elevation: 89 m (292 ft)
- Population (2023): 130
  - Density: 4.5/km^{2} (12/sq mi)
- Time zone: UTC+01:00 (CET)
  - Summer (DST): UTC+02:00 (CEST)
- INSEE/Postal code: 51164 /51230
- ^{1} French Land Register data, which excludes lakes, ponds, glaciers > 1 km^{2} (0.386 sq mi or 247 acres) and river estuaries.

Connantray-Vaurefroy is a commune in the Marne department in north-eastern France.

== See also ==
- Communes of the Marne department
