= Saint-Saturnin, Marne =

Saint-Saturnin
- Commune
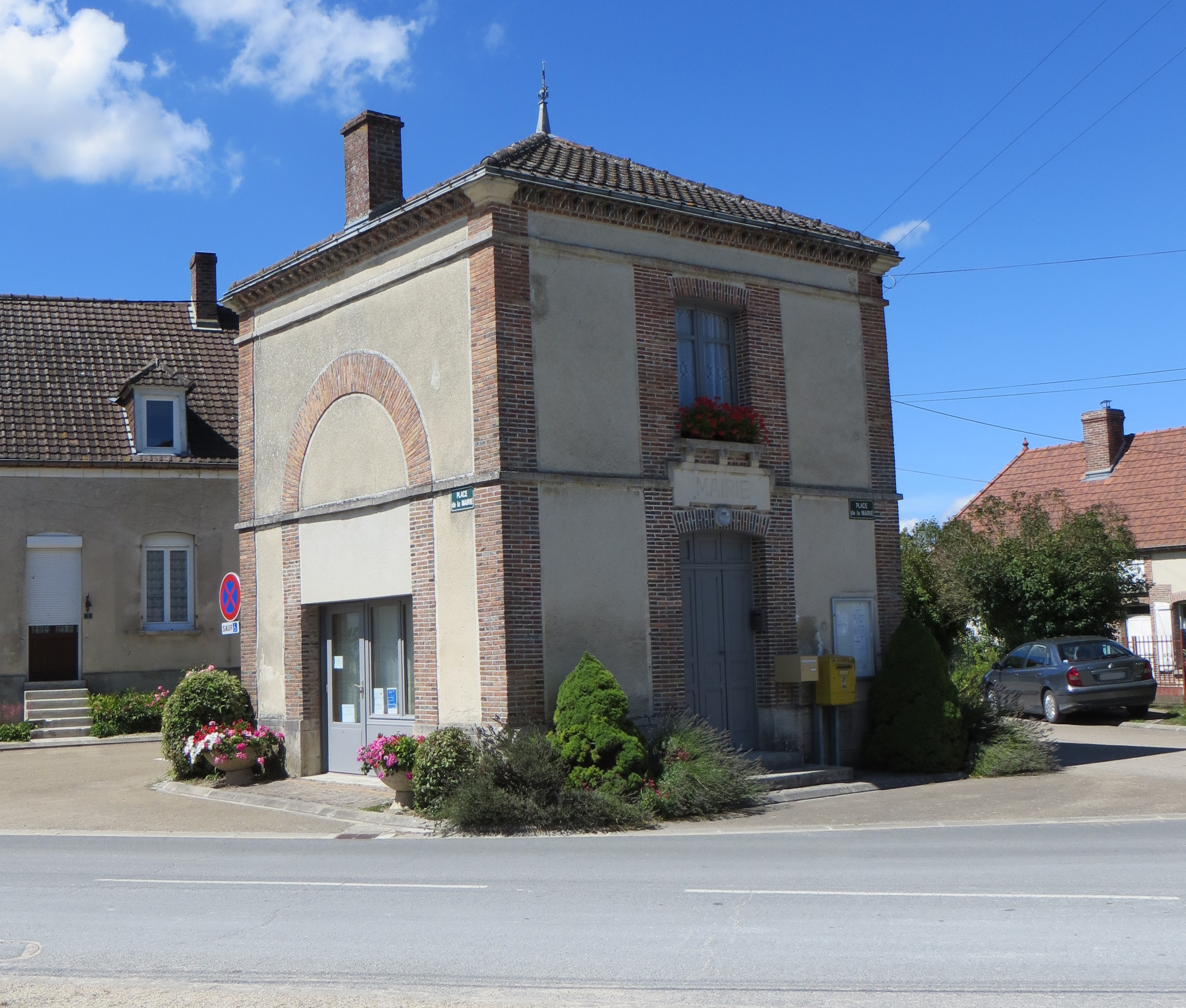
- The town hall in Saint-Saturnin
- Location of Saint-Saturnin
- Location within France Location within Grand Est
- Coordinates: 48°36′48″N 3°54′12″E
- Country: France
- Region: Grand Est
- Department: Marne
- Arrondissement: Épernay
- Canton: Vertus-Plaine Champenoise

Government
  - Mayor (2020–2026): Lysiane Denis
- Area^{1}: 7.96 km^{2} (3.07 sq mi)
- Elevation: 92 m (302 ft)
- Population (2023): 47
  - Density: 5.9/km^{2} (15/sq mi)
- Time zone: UTC+01:00 (CET)
  - Summer (DST): UTC+02:00 (CEST)
- INSEE/Postal code: 51516 /51260
- ^{1} French Land Register data, which excludes lakes, ponds, glaciers > 1 km^{2} (0.386 sq mi or 247 acres) and river estuaries.

Saint-Saturnin (French pronunciation: [sɛ̃ satyʁnɛ̃]) is a commune in the Marne department in north-eastern France.

== See also ==
- Communes of the Marne department
