= Potangis =

- Commune
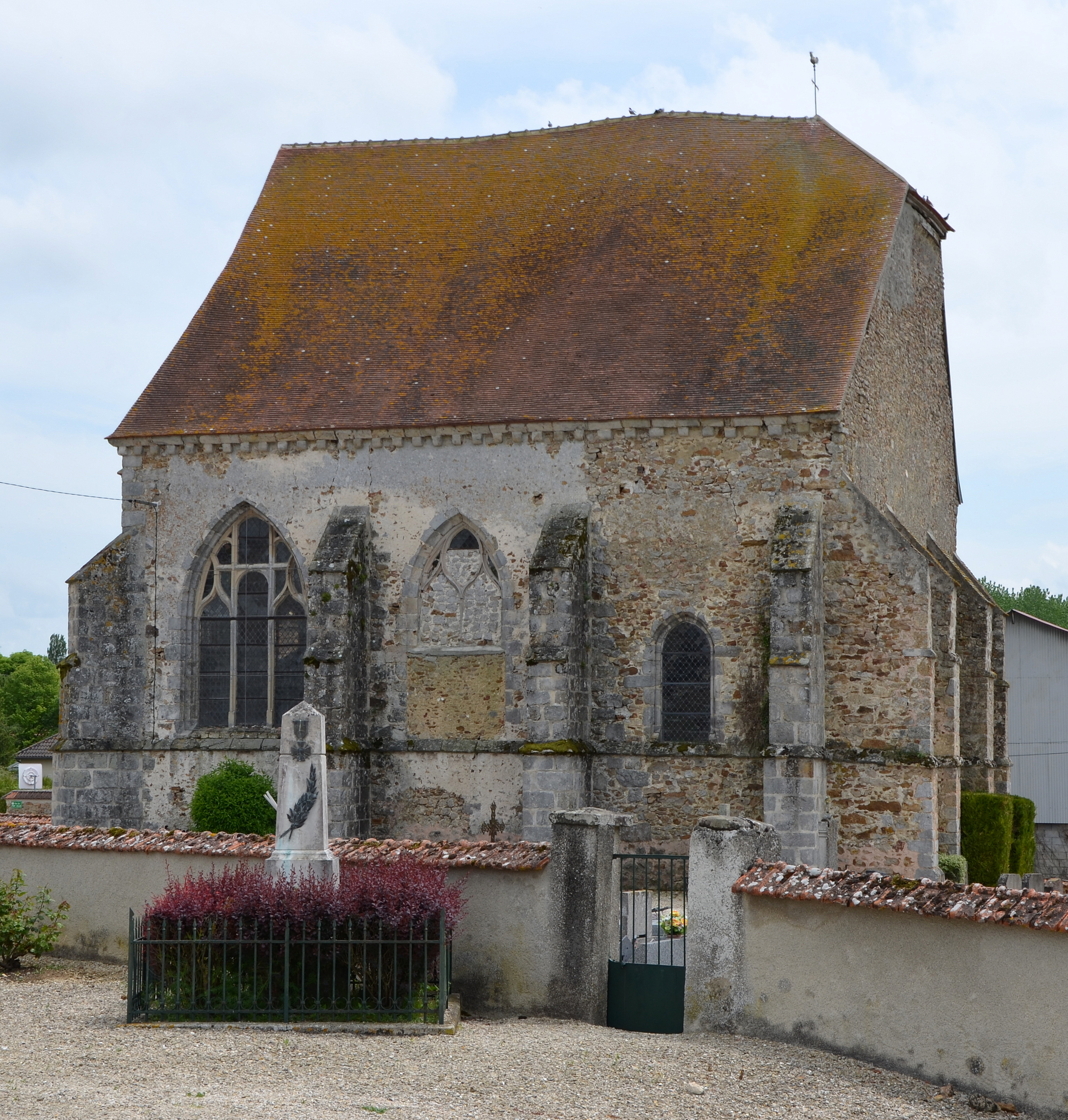
- The church in Potangis

- Coat of arms
- Location of Potangis
- Location within France Location within Grand Est
- Coordinates: 48°35′18″N 3°38′42″E
- Country: France
- Region: Grand Est
- Department: Marne
- Arrondissement: Épernay
- Canton: Vertus-Plaine Champenoise
- Intercommunality: Sézanne-Sud Ouest Marnais

Government
  - Mayor (2020–2026): Michel Dorbais
- Area^{1}: 8.87 km^{2} (3.42 sq mi)
- Elevation: 81 m (266 ft)
- Population (2023): 114
  - Density: 12.9/km^{2} (33.3/sq mi)
- Time zone: UTC+01:00 (CET)
  - Summer (DST): UTC+02:00 (CEST)
- INSEE/Postal code: 51443 /51260
- ^{1} French Land Register data, which excludes lakes, ponds, glaciers > 1 km^{2} (0.386 sq mi or 247 acres) and river estuaries.

Potangis (French pronunciation: [pɔtɑ̃ʒi]) is a commune in the Marne department in north-eastern France.

== See also ==
- Communes of the Marne department
