= Moslins =

- Commune
- Location of Moslins
- Location within France Location within Grand Est
- Coordinates: 48°58′08″N 3°55′35″E
- Country: France
- Region: Grand Est
- Department: Marne
- Arrondissement: Épernay
- Canton: Vertus-Plaine Champenoise
- Intercommunality: CA Épernay, Coteaux et Plaine de Champagne

Government
  - Mayor (2021–2026): Sébastien Prevoteau
- Area^{1}: 11.72 km^{2} (4.53 sq mi)
- Elevation: 172 m (564 ft)
- Population (2023): 288
  - Density: 24.6/km^{2} (63.6/sq mi)
- Time zone: UTC+01:00 (CET)
  - Summer (DST): UTC+02:00 (CEST)
- INSEE/Postal code: 51387 /51530
- ^{1} French Land Register data, which excludes lakes, ponds, glaciers > 1 km^{2} (0.386 sq mi or 247 acres) and river estuaries.

Moslins (French pronunciation: [molɛ̃]) is a commune in the Marne department in north-eastern France.

== See also ==
- Communes of the Marne department
