= Bagneux, Marne =

Bagneux
- Commune
- Coat of arms
- Location of Bagneux
- Location within France Location within Grand Est
- Coordinates: 48°33′30″N 3°49′45″E
- Country: France
- Region: Grand Est
- Department: Marne
- Arrondissement: Épernay
- Canton: Vertus-Plaine Champenoise

Government
  - Mayor (2020–2026): François Martin
- Area^{1}: 13.8 km^{2} (5.3 sq mi)
- Elevation: 79 m (259 ft)
- Population (2023): 405
  - Density: 29.3/km^{2} (76.0/sq mi)
- Time zone: UTC+01:00 (CET)
  - Summer (DST): UTC+02:00 (CEST)
- INSEE/Postal code: 51032 /51260
- ^{1} French Land Register data, which excludes lakes, ponds, glaciers > 1 km^{2} (0.386 sq mi or 247 acres) and river estuaries.

Bagneux (French pronunciation: [baɲø]) is a commune in the Marne department in northeastern France.

== Population ==
Historical population
Year	Pop.	±% p.a.
1968	521	—
1975	458	−1.82%
1982	516	+1.72%
1990	501	−0.37%
1999	458	−0.99%
2007	500	+1.10%
2012	496	−0.16%
2017	448	−2.02%
2023	405	−1.67%
Source: INSEE

== See also ==
- Communes of the Marne department
