= Broussy-le-Grand =

- Commune
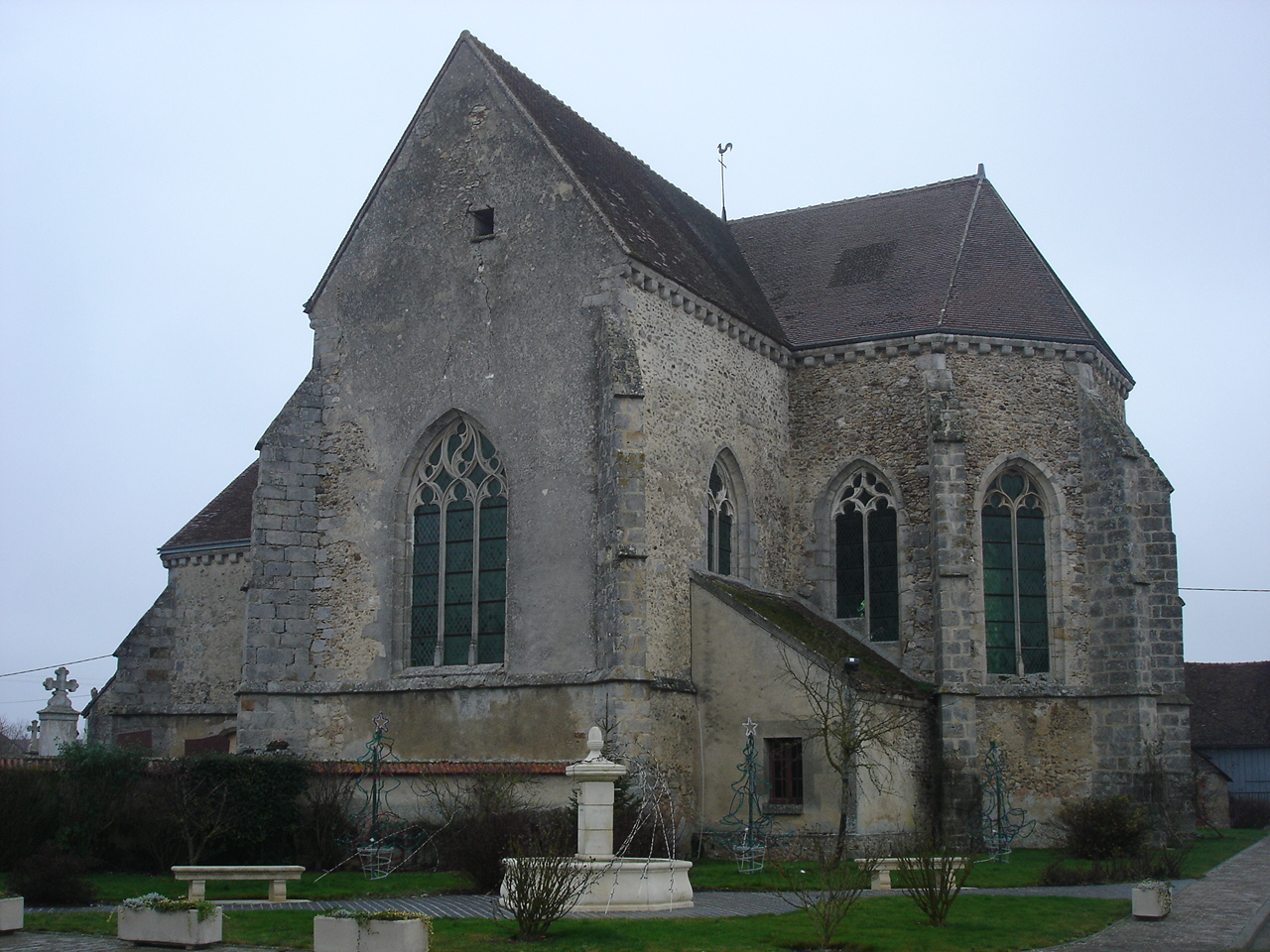
- The church in Broussy-le-Grand
- Location of Broussy-le-Grand
- Location within France Location within Grand Est
- Coordinates: 48°47′16″N 3°52′47″E
- Country: France
- Region: Grand Est
- Department: Marne
- Arrondissement: Épernay
- Canton: Vertus-Plaine Champenoise
- Intercommunality: Sud Marnais

Government
  - Mayor (2020–2026): Alain Goncalves
- Area^{1}: 21.31 km^{2} (8.23 sq mi)
- Elevation: 110 m (360 ft)
- Population (2023): 309
  - Density: 14.5/km^{2} (37.6/sq mi)
- Time zone: UTC+01:00 (CET)
  - Summer (DST): UTC+02:00 (CEST)
- INSEE/Postal code: 51090 /51230
- ^{1} French Land Register data, which excludes lakes, ponds, glaciers > 1 km^{2} (0.386 sq mi or 247 acres) and river estuaries.

Broussy-le-Grand (French pronunciation: [bʁusi lə ɡʁɑ̃]) is a commune in the Marne department in northeastern France.

== Population ==
Historical population
Year	Pop.	±% p.a.
1968	260	—
1975	225	−2.04%
1982	248	+1.40%
1990	258	+0.50%
1999	257	−0.04%
2007	295	+1.74%
2012	312	+1.13%
2017	312	+0.00%
2023	309	−0.16%
Source: INSEE

== See also ==
- Communes of the Marne department
