= Vouzy =

- Commune
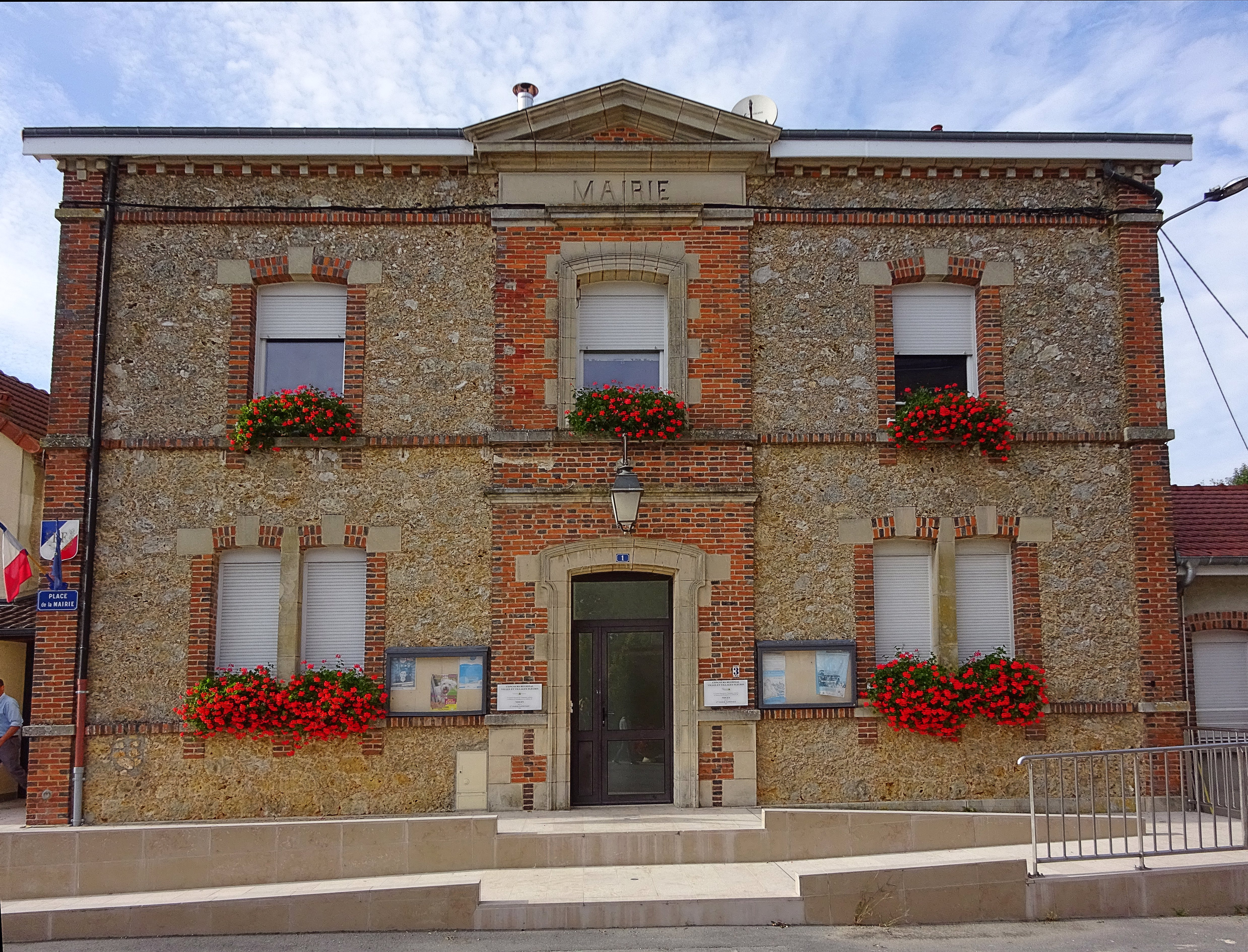
- The town hall in Vouzy
- Location of Vouzy
- Location within France Location within Grand Est
- Coordinates: 48°55′34″N 4°06′41″E
- Country: France
- Region: Grand Est
- Department: Marne
- Arrondissement: Épernay
- Canton: Vertus-Plaine Champenoise
- Intercommunality: CA Épernay, Coteaux et Plaine de Champagne

Government
  - Mayor (2020–2026): Frédéric Maillet
- Area^{1}: 9.44 km^{2} (3.64 sq mi)
- Elevation: 92 m (302 ft)
- Highest elevation: 131 m (430 ft)
- Lowest elevation: 87 m (285 ft)
- Population (2023): 299
  - Density: 31.7/km^{2} (82.0/sq mi)
- Time zone: UTC+01:00 (CET)
  - Summer (DST): UTC+02:00 (CEST)
- INSEE/Postal code: 51655 /51130
- ^{1} French Land Register data, which excludes lakes, ponds, glaciers > 1 km^{2} (0.386 sq mi or 247 acres) and river estuaries.

Vouzy (French pronunciation: [vuzi]) is a commune in the Marne department in north-eastern France.

== Population ==
Population
Year	1962	1968	1975	1982	1990	1999	2006	2011	2018
Population	189	203	201	212	218	254	303	310	292

== See also ==
- Communes of the Marne department
