= Pierre-Morains =

- Commune
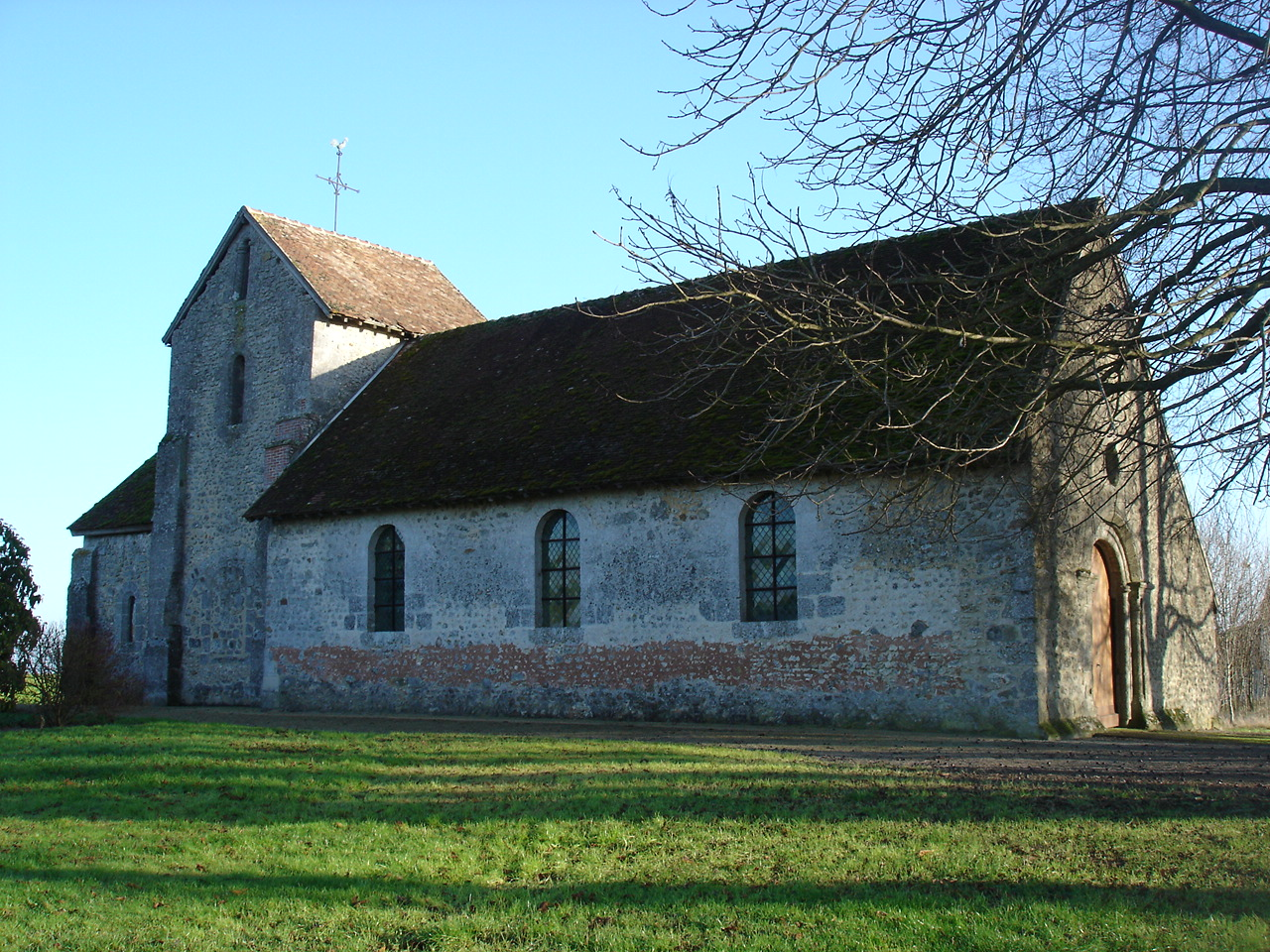
- The church in Pierre-Morains
- Location of Pierre-Morains
- Location within France Location within Grand Est
- Coordinates: 48°50′11″N 4°01′23″E
- Country: France
- Region: Grand Est
- Department: Marne
- Arrondissement: Épernay
- Canton: Vertus-Plaine Champenoise
- Intercommunality: CA Épernay, Coteaux et Plaine de Champagne

Government
  - Mayor (2020–2026): Michèle Poiret
- Area^{1}: 13.44 km^{2} (5.19 sq mi)
- Elevation: 155 m (509 ft)
- Population (2023): 99
  - Density: 7.4/km^{2} (19/sq mi)
- Time zone: UTC+01:00 (CET)
  - Summer (DST): UTC+02:00 (CEST)
- INSEE/Postal code: 51430 /51130
- ^{1} French Land Register data, which excludes lakes, ponds, glaciers > 1 km^{2} (0.386 sq mi or 247 acres) and river estuaries.

Pierre-Morains (French pronunciation: [pjɛʁ mɔʁɛ̃]) is a commune in the Marne department in north-eastern France.

== See also ==
- Communes of the Marne department
