= Vouarces =

- Commune
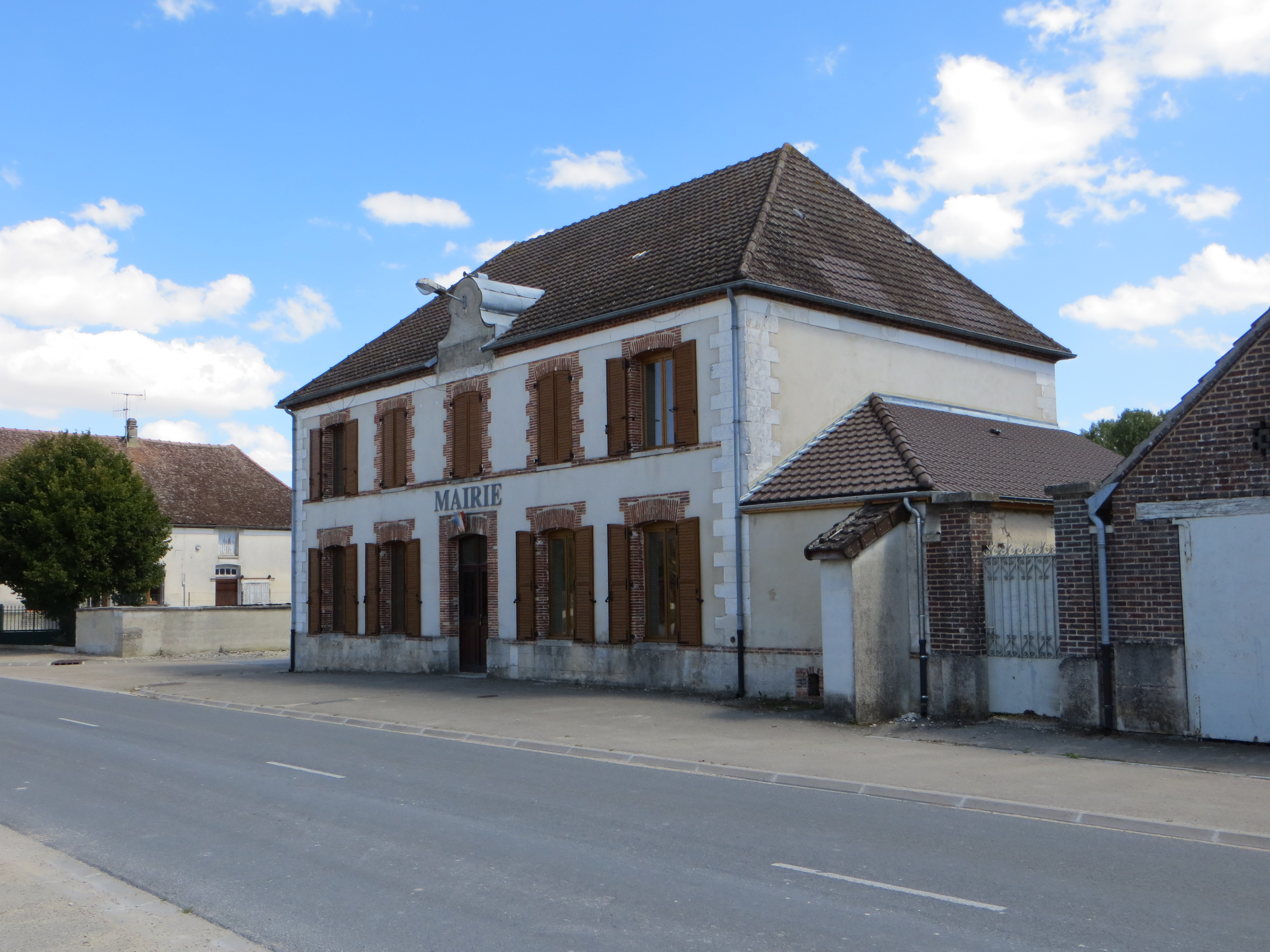
- The town hall in Vouarces
- Location of Vouarces
- Location within France Location within Grand Est
- Coordinates: 48°35′32″N 3°53′54″E
- Country: France
- Region: Grand Est
- Department: Marne
- Arrondissement: Épernay
- Canton: Vertus-Plaine Champenoise
- Intercommunality: Sézanne-Sud Ouest Marnais

Government
  - Mayor (2020–2026): Jean-Luc Hatat
- Area^{1}: 5.96 km^{2} (2.30 sq mi)
- Elevation: 80 m (260 ft)
- Population (2023): 63
  - Density: 11/km^{2} (27/sq mi)
- Time zone: UTC+01:00 (CET)
  - Summer (DST): UTC+02:00 (CEST)
- INSEE/Postal code: 51652 /51260
- ^{1} French Land Register data, which excludes lakes, ponds, glaciers > 1 km^{2} (0.386 sq mi or 247 acres) and river estuaries.

Vouarces (French pronunciation: [vwaʁs]) is a commune in the Marne department in north-eastern France. Vouarces offers a hotel service. As of 2007 its population is 59.

== See also ==
- Communes of the Marne department
