= Clesles =

- Commune
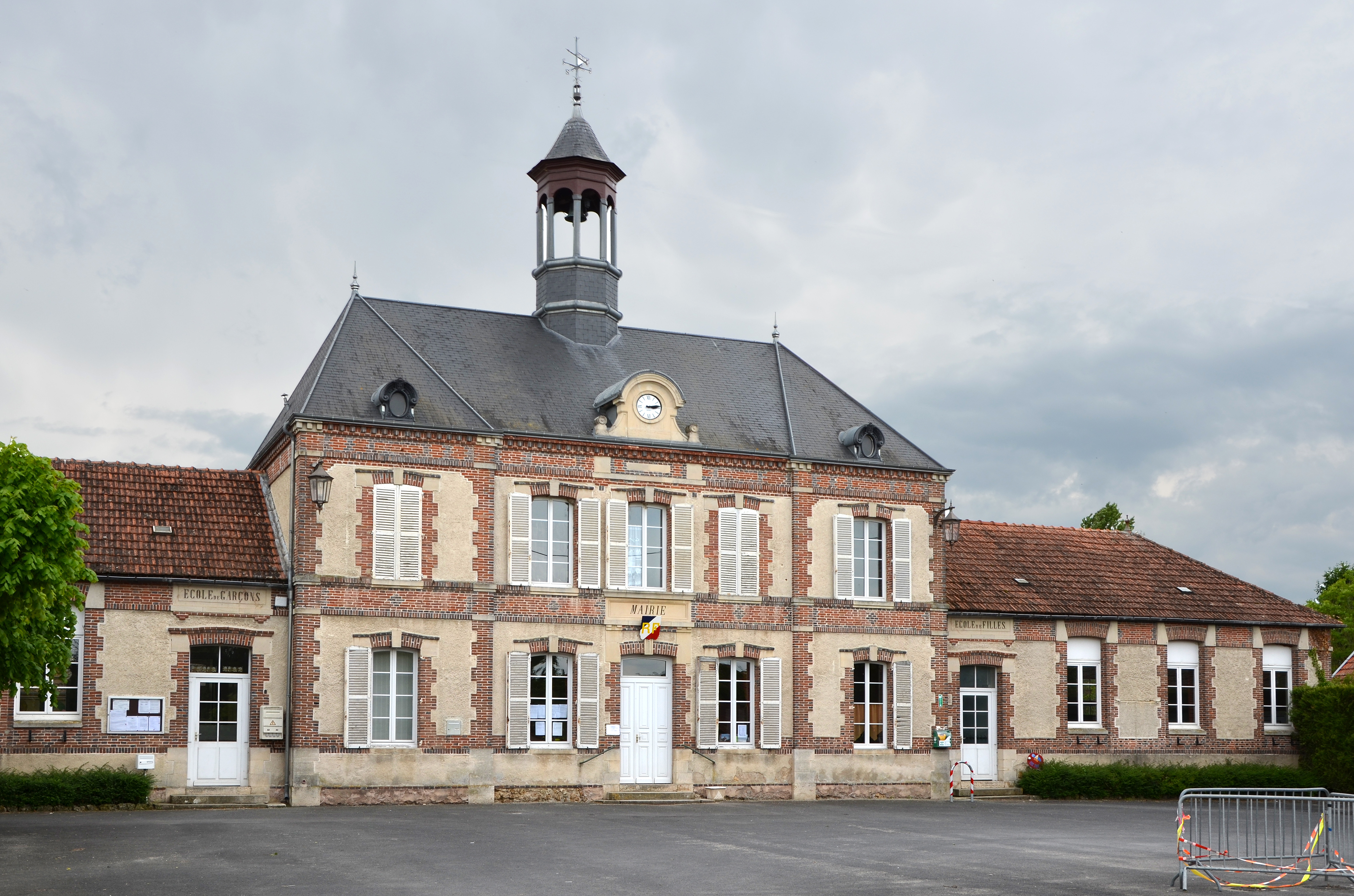
- The town hall in Clesles
- Location of Clesles
- Location within France Location within Grand Est
- Coordinates: 48°32′03″N 3°49′57″E
- Country: France
- Region: Grand Est
- Department: Marne
- Arrondissement: Épernay
- Canton: Vertus-Plaine Champenoise
- Intercommunality: Sézanne-Sud Ouest Marnais

Government
  - Mayor (2020–2026): Yves Gerlot
- Area^{1}: 13.26 km^{2} (5.12 sq mi)
- Elevation: 79 m (259 ft)
- Population (2023): 615
  - Density: 46.4/km^{2} (120/sq mi)
- Time zone: UTC+01:00 (CET)
  - Summer (DST): UTC+02:00 (CEST)
- INSEE/Postal code: 51155 /51260
- ^{1} French Land Register data, which excludes lakes, ponds, glaciers > 1 km^{2} (0.386 sq mi or 247 acres) and river estuaries.

Clesles is a commune in the Marne department in north-eastern France.

== See also ==
- Communes of the Marne department
