= Marsangis =

- Commune
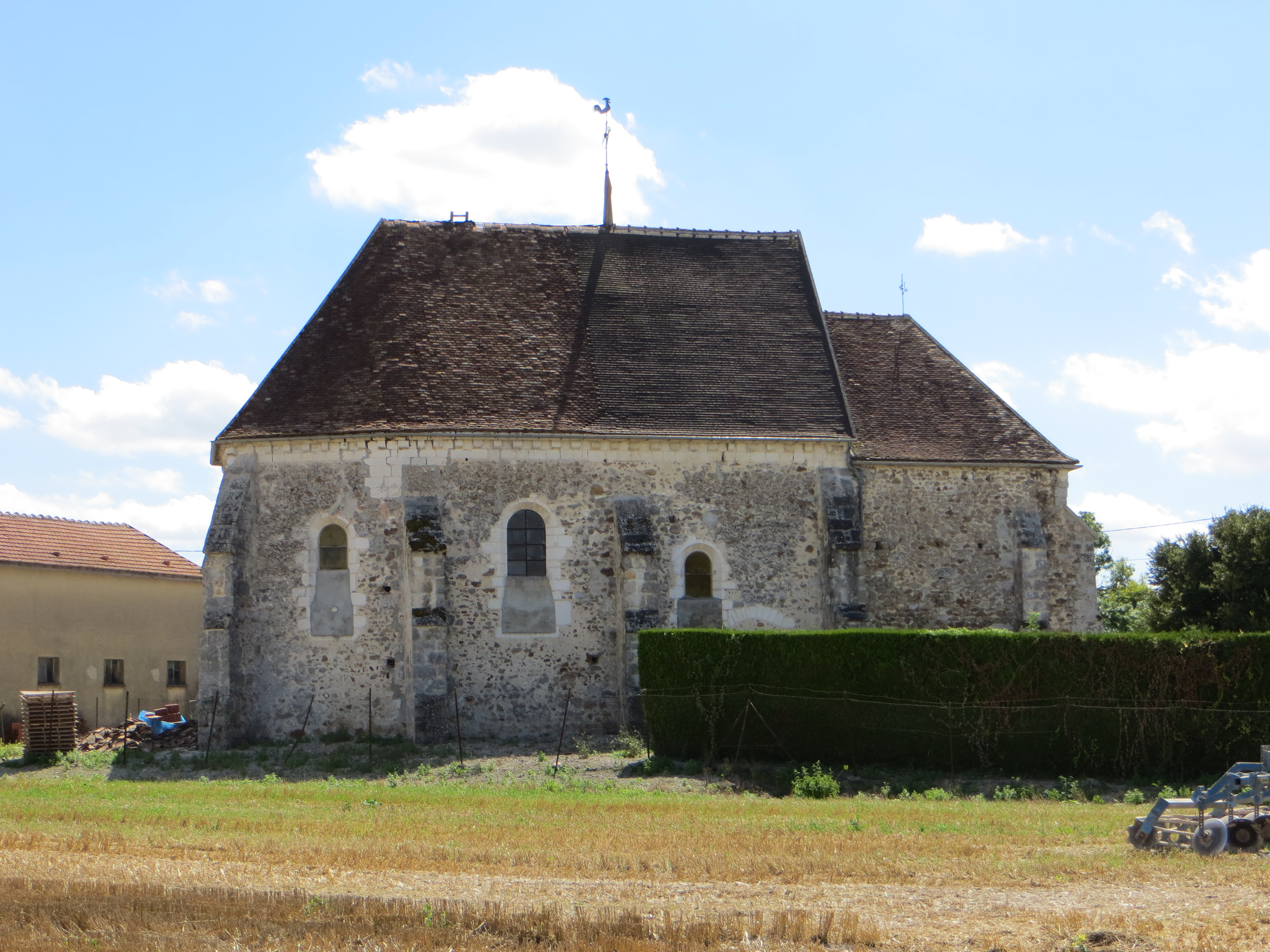
- The church in Marsangis
- Location of Marsangis
- Location within France Location within Grand Est
- Coordinates: 48°36′22″N 3°50′13″E
- Country: France
- Region: Grand Est
- Department: Marne
- Arrondissement: Épernay
- Canton: Vertus-Plaine Champenoise
- Intercommunality: Sézanne-Sud Ouest Marnais

Government
  - Mayor (2020–2026): Philippe Lebègue
- Area^{1}: 6.74 km^{2} (2.60 sq mi)
- Elevation: 77 m (253 ft)
- Population (2023): 45
  - Density: 6.7/km^{2} (17/sq mi)
- Time zone: UTC+01:00 (CET)
  - Summer (DST): UTC+02:00 (CEST)
- INSEE/Postal code: 51353 /51260
- ^{1} French Land Register data, which excludes lakes, ponds, glaciers > 1 km^{2} (0.386 sq mi or 247 acres) and river estuaries.

Marsangis is a commune in the Marne department in north-eastern France.

== See also ==
- Communes of the Marne department
