= La Chapelle-Lasson =

- Commune
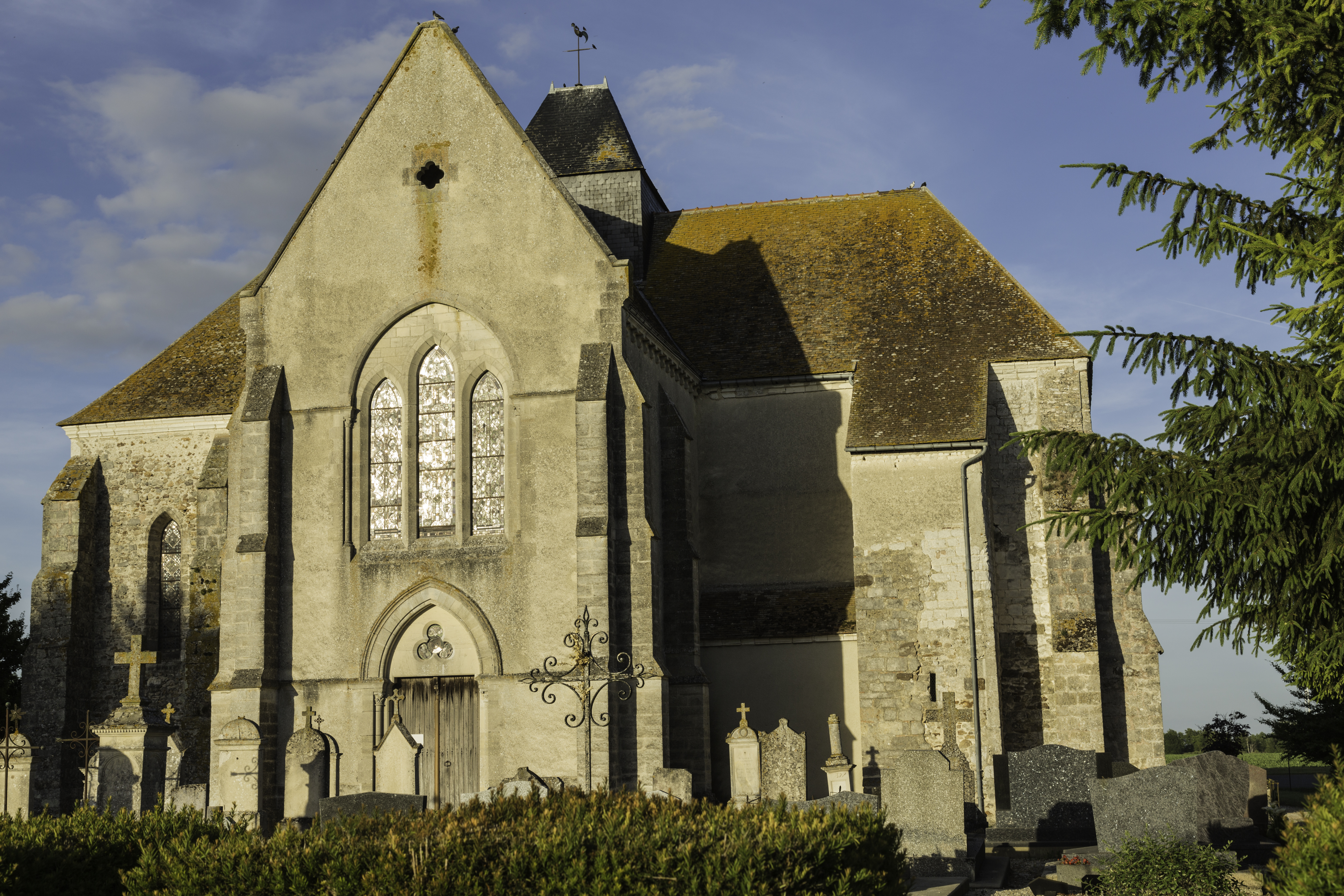
- The church in Lasson
- Location of La Chapelle-Lasson
- Location within France Location within Grand Est
- Coordinates: 48°37′41″N 3°49′59″E
- Country: France
- Region: Grand Est
- Department: Marne
- Arrondissement: Épernay
- Canton: Vertus-Plaine Champenoise
- Intercommunality: Sézanne-Sud Ouest Marnais

Government
  - Mayor (2020–2026): Alain Basson
- Area^{1}: 15.04 km^{2} (5.81 sq mi)
- Elevation: 78 m (256 ft)
- Population (2023): 85
  - Density: 5.7/km^{2} (15/sq mi)
- Time zone: UTC+01:00 (CET)
  - Summer (DST): UTC+02:00 (CEST)
- INSEE/Postal code: 51127 /51260
- ^{1} French Land Register data, which excludes lakes, ponds, glaciers > 1 km^{2} (0.386 sq mi or 247 acres) and river estuaries.

La Chapelle-Lasson (French pronunciation: [la ʃapɛl lasɔ̃]) is a commune in the Marne department in north-eastern France.

== See also ==
- Communes of the Marne department
