= Esclavolles-Lurey =

- Commune
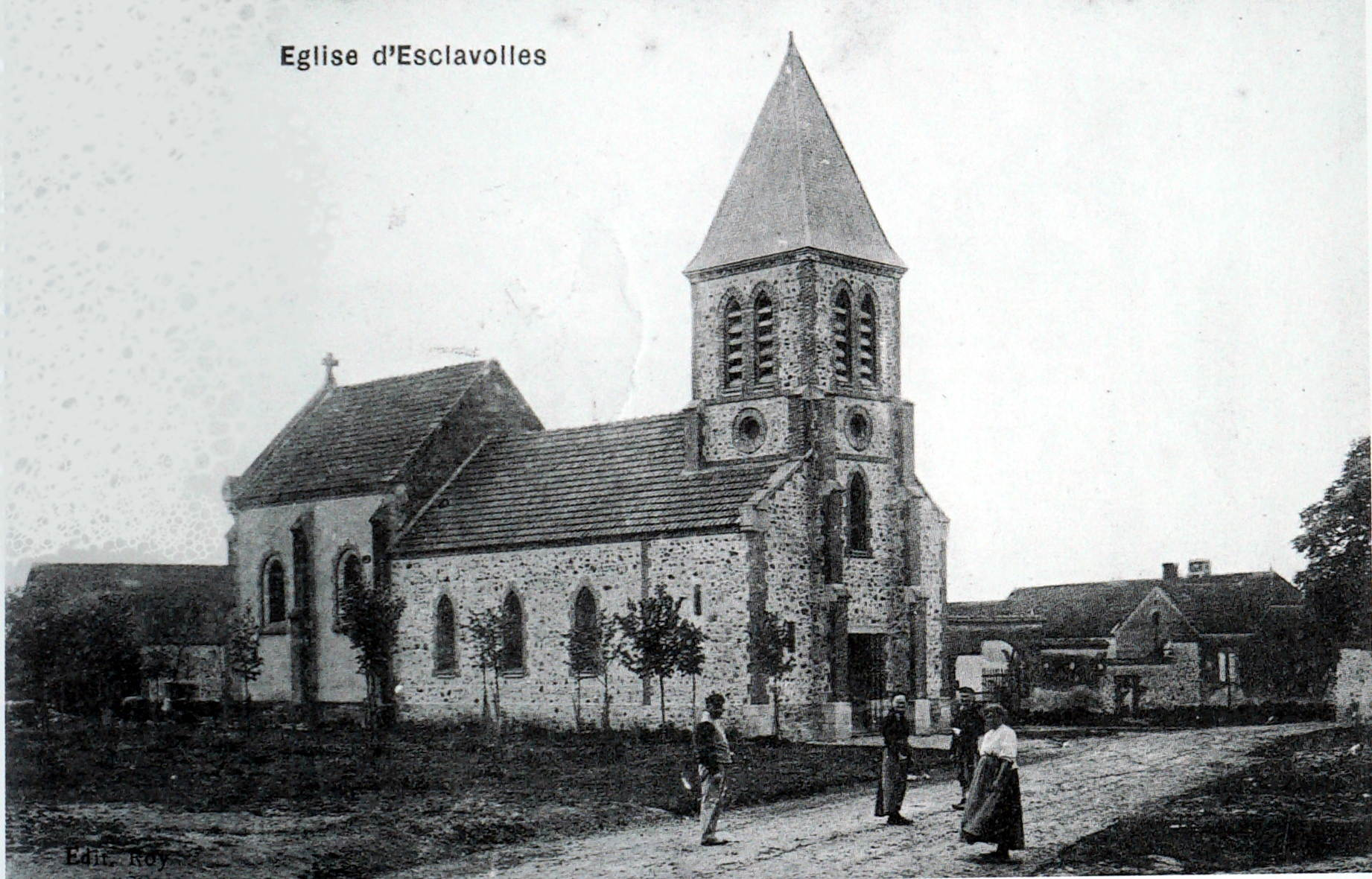
- The church of Esclavolles in 1912
- Location of Esclavolles-Lurey
- Location within France Location within Grand Est
- Coordinates: 48°33′11″N 3°39′30″E
- Country: France
- Region: Grand Est
- Department: Marne
- Arrondissement: Épernay
- Canton: Vertus-Plaine Champenoise
- Intercommunality: Sézanne-Sud Ouest Marnais

Government
  - Mayor (2020–2026): Noël Fessard
- Area^{1}: 9.47 km^{2} (3.66 sq mi)
- Elevation: 86 m (282 ft)
- Population (2023): 647
  - Density: 68.3/km^{2} (177/sq mi)
- Time zone: UTC+01:00 (CET)
  - Summer (DST): UTC+02:00 (CEST)
- INSEE/Postal code: 51234 /51260
- ^{1} French Land Register data, which excludes lakes, ponds, glaciers > 1 km^{2} (0.386 sq mi or 247 acres) and river estuaries.

Esclavolles-Lurey (French pronunciation: [eklavɔl lyʁɛ]) is a commune in the Marne department in north-eastern France.

== See also ==
- Communes of the Marne department
