= Canton of Vertus-Plaine Champenoise =

Coordinates: 48.91°N 4.00°E

The canton of Vertus-Plaine Champenoise is an administrative division of the Marne department, northeastern France. It was created at the French canton reorganisation which came into effect in March 2015. Its seat is in Blancs-Coteaux.

It consists of the following communes:

1. Allemanche-Launay-et-Soyer
2. Anglure
3. Angluzelles-et-Courcelles
4. Athis
5. Bagneux
6. Bannes
7. Baudement
8. Bergères-lès-Vertus
9. Blancs-Coteaux
10. Broussy-le-Grand
11. La Celle-sous-Chantemerle
12. Chaintrix-Bierges
13. Chaltrait
14. La Chapelle-Lasson
15. Clamanges
16. Clesles
17. Conflans-sur-Seine
18. Connantray-Vaurefroy
19. Connantre
20. Corroy
21. Courcemain
22. Écury-le-Repos
23. Esclavolles-Lurey
24. Étréchy
25. Euvy
26. Faux-Fresnay
27. Fère-Champenoise
28. Germinon
29. Givry-lès-Loisy
30. Gourgançon
31. Granges-sur-Aube
32. Loisy-en-Brie
33. Marcilly-sur-Seine
34. Marigny
35. Marsangis
36. Le Mesnil-sur-Oger
37. Moslins
38. Ognes
39. Pierre-Morains
40. Pleurs
41. Pocancy
42. Potangis
43. Rouffy
44. Saint-Just-Sauvage
45. Saint-Mard-lès-Rouffy
46. Saint-Quentin-le-Verger
47. Saint-Saturnin
48. Saron-sur-Aube
49. Soulières
50. Thaas
51. Trécon
52. Val-des-Marais
53. Vélye
54. Vert-Toulon
55. Villeneuve-Renneville-Chevigny
56. Villers-aux-Bois
57. Villeseneux
58. Villiers-aux-Corneilles
59. Vouarces
60. Vouzy
