= La Celle-sous-Chantemerle =

- Commune
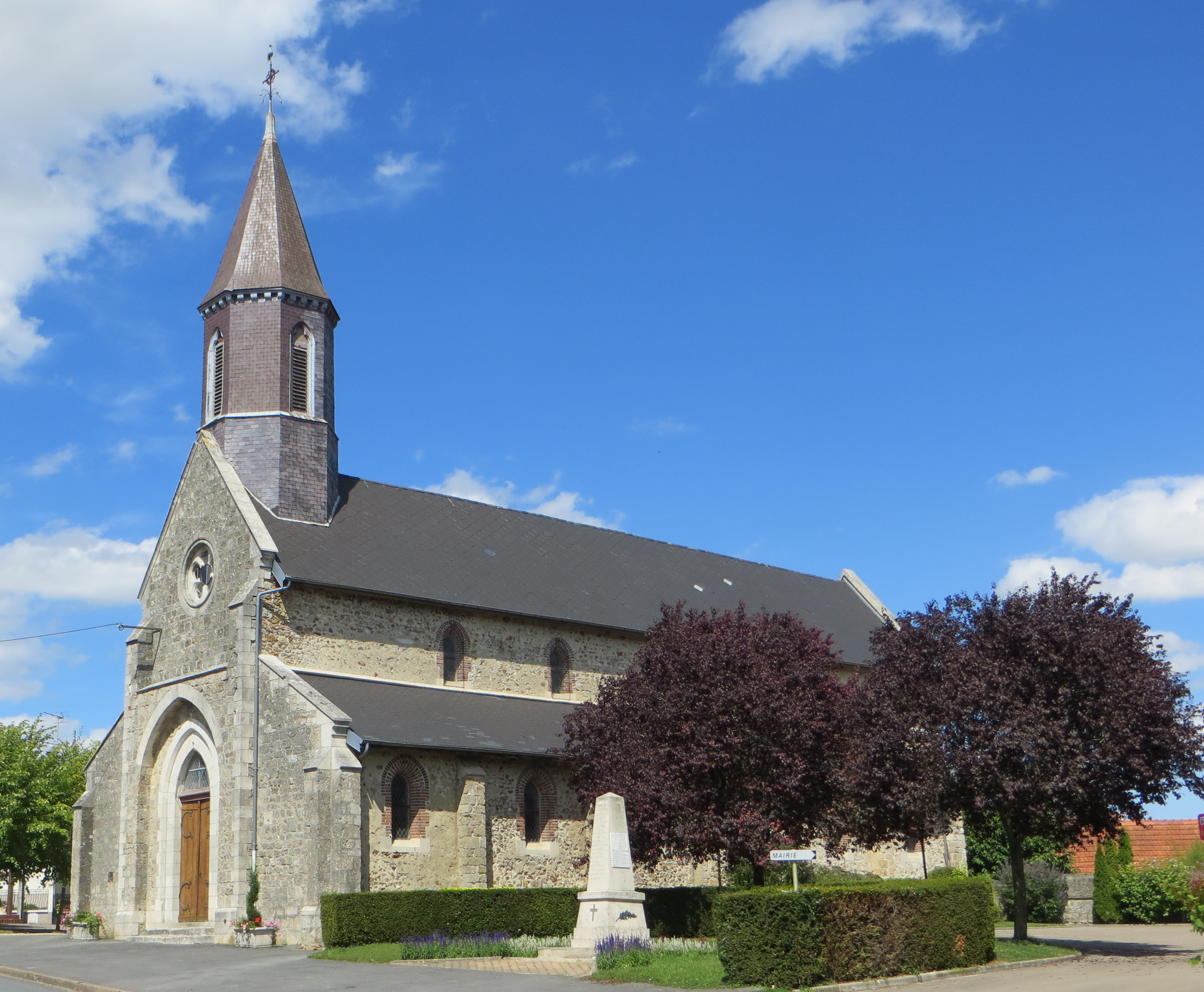
- The church in La Celle-sous-Chantemerle
- Location of La Celle-sous-Chantemerle
- Location within France Location within Grand Est
- Coordinates: 48°36′51″N 3°40′43″E
- Country: France
- Region: Grand Est
- Department: Marne
- Arrondissement: Épernay
- Canton: Vertus-Plaine Champenoise
- Intercommunality: Sézanne-Sud Ouest Marnais

Government
  - Mayor (2020–2026): Frédéric Orcin
- Area^{1}: 12.03 km^{2} (4.64 sq mi)
- Elevation: 129 m (423 ft)
- Population (2023): 136
  - Density: 11.3/km^{2} (29.3/sq mi)
- Time zone: UTC+01:00 (CET)
  - Summer (DST): UTC+02:00 (CEST)
- INSEE/Postal code: 51103 /51260
- ^{1} French Land Register data, which excludes lakes, ponds, glaciers > 1 km^{2} (0.386 sq mi or 247 acres) and river estuaries.

La Celle-sous-Chantemerle (French pronunciation: [la sɛl su ʃɑ̃tmɛʁl], literally La Celle under Chantemerle) is a commune in the Marne department in the Grand Est region in north-eastern France.

== See also ==
- Communes of the Marne department
