= Euvy =

- Commune
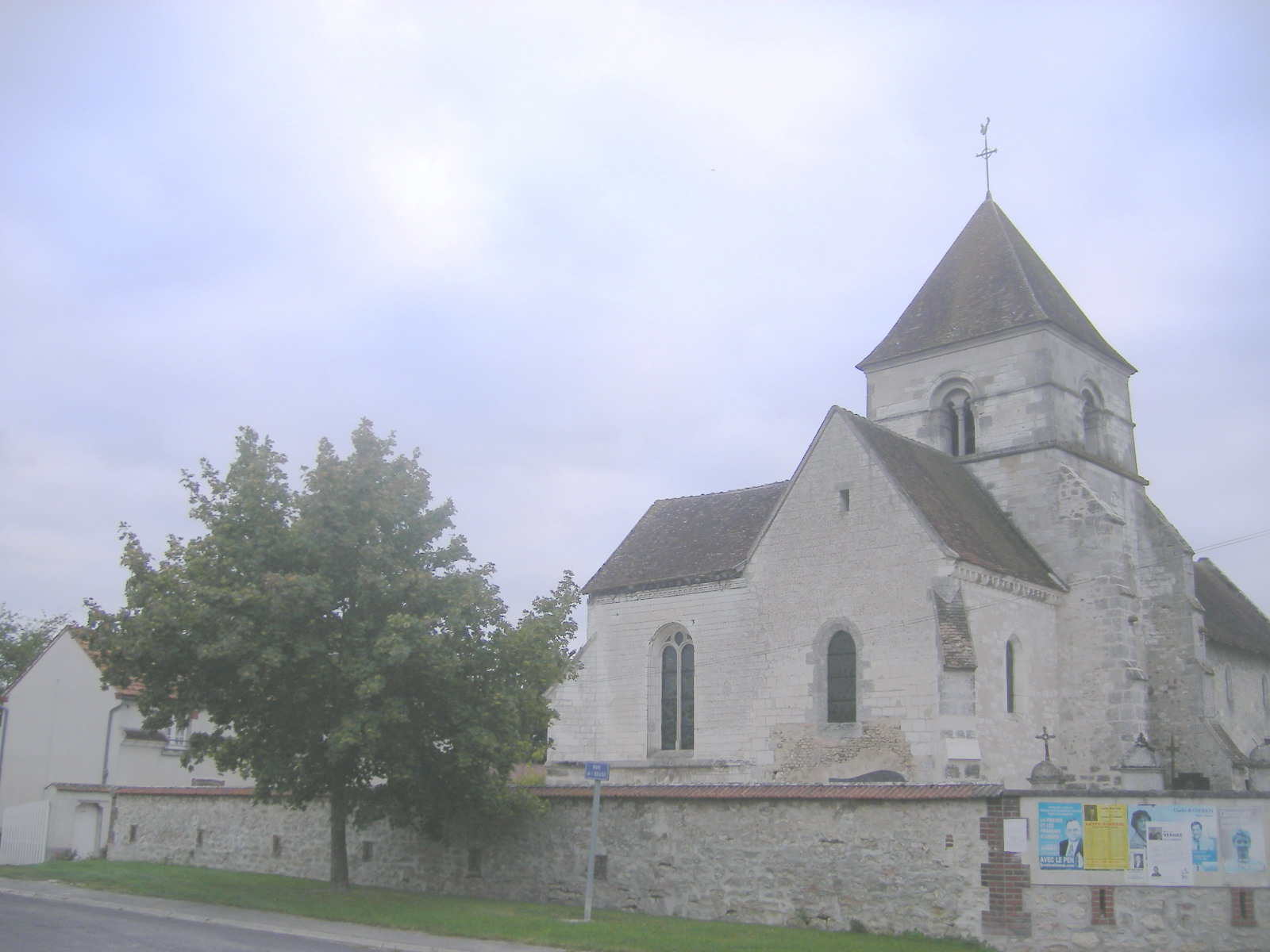
- The church in Euvy
- Location of Euvy
- Location within France Location within Grand Est
- Coordinates: 48°43′15″N 4°01′49″E
- Country: France
- Region: Grand Est
- Department: Marne
- Arrondissement: Épernay
- Canton: Vertus-Plaine Champenoise
- Intercommunality: Sud Marnais

Government
  - Mayor (2020–2026): Bernard Guyard
- Area^{1}: 14.43 km^{2} (5.57 sq mi)
- Elevation: 129 m (423 ft)
- Population (2023): 80
  - Density: 5.5/km^{2} (14/sq mi)
- Time zone: UTC+01:00 (CET)
  - Summer (DST): UTC+02:00 (CEST)
- INSEE/Postal code: 51241 /51230
- ^{1} French Land Register data, which excludes lakes, ponds, glaciers > 1 km^{2} (0.386 sq mi or 247 acres) and river estuaries.

Euvy (French pronunciation: [øvi]) is a commune in the Marne department in north-eastern France.

== See also ==
- Communes of the Marne department
