= Allemanche-Launay-et-Soyer =

- Commune
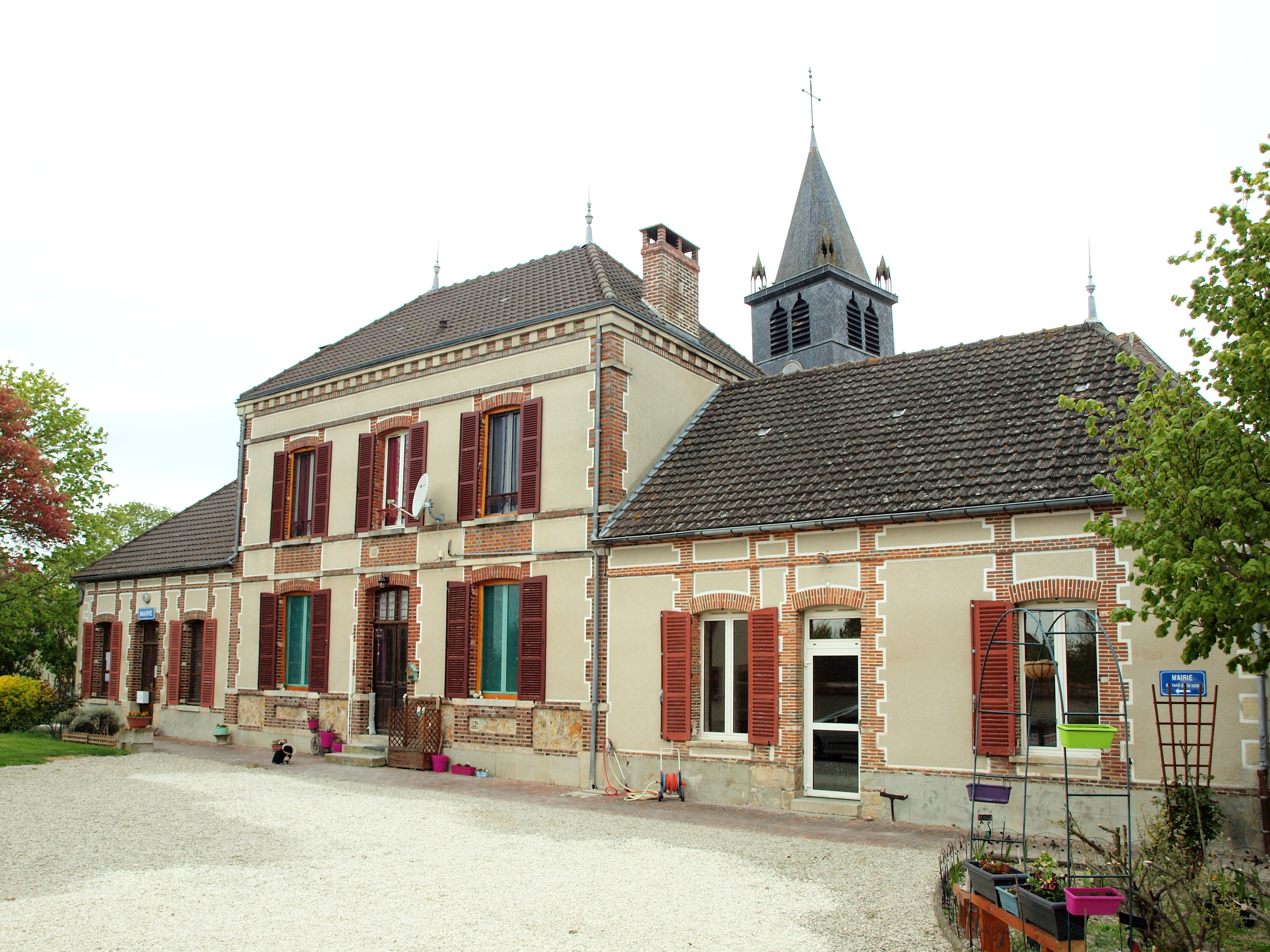
- The town hall in Allemanche
- Location of Allemanche-Launay-et-Soyer
- Location within France Location within Grand Est
- Coordinates: 48°36′18″N 3°47′17″E
- Country: France
- Region: Grand Est
- Department: Marne
- Arrondissement: Épernay
- Canton: Vertus-Plaine Champenoise
- Intercommunality: Sézanne-Sud Ouest Marnais

Government
  - Mayor (2020–2026): Bernard Champion
- Area^{1}: 15.24 km^{2} (5.88 sq mi)
- Elevation: 77 m (253 ft)
- Population (2023): 121
  - Density: 7.94/km^{2} (20.6/sq mi)
- Time zone: UTC+01:00 (CET)
  - Summer (DST): UTC+02:00 (CEST)
- INSEE/Postal code: 51004 /51260
- ^{1} French Land Register data, which excludes lakes, ponds, glaciers > 1 km^{2} (0.386 sq mi or 247 acres) and river estuaries.

Allemanche-Launay-et-Soyer (French pronunciation: [almɑ̃ʃ lonɛ e swaje]) is a commune in the Marne department in northeastern France.

== Population ==
Historical population
Year	Pop.	±% p.a.
1968	123	—
1975	120	−0.35%
1982	133	+1.48%
1990	126	−0.67%
1999	115	−1.01%
2007	104	−1.25%
2012	106	+0.38%
2017	111	+0.93%
2023	121	+1.45%
Source: INSEE

== See also ==
- Communes of the Marne department
