= Baudement =

- Commune
- Location of Baudement
- Location within France Location within Grand Est
- Coordinates: 48°34′36″N 3°46′38″E
- Country: France
- Region: Grand Est
- Department: Marne
- Arrondissement: Épernay
- Canton: Vertus-Plaine Champenoise

Government
  - Mayor (2020–2026): Gérard Fricault
- Area^{1}: 8.57 km^{2} (3.31 sq mi)
- Elevation: 84 m (276 ft)
- Population (2023): 98
  - Density: 11/km^{2} (30/sq mi)
- Time zone: UTC+01:00 (CET)
  - Summer (DST): UTC+02:00 (CEST)
- INSEE/Postal code: 51041 /51260
- ^{1} French Land Register data, which excludes lakes, ponds, glaciers > 1 km^{2} (0.386 sq mi or 247 acres) and river estuaries.

Baudement (French pronunciation: [bodmɑ̃]) is a commune in the Marne department in northeastern France.

== Population ==
Historical population
Year	Pop.	±% p.a.
1968	98	—
1975	101	+0.43%
1982	103	+0.28%
1990	103	+0.00%
1999	111	+0.83%
2007	113	+0.22%
2012	121	+1.38%
2017	110	−1.89%
2023	98	−1.91%
Source: INSEE

== See also ==
- Communes of the Marne department
