= Conflans-sur-Seine =

- Commune
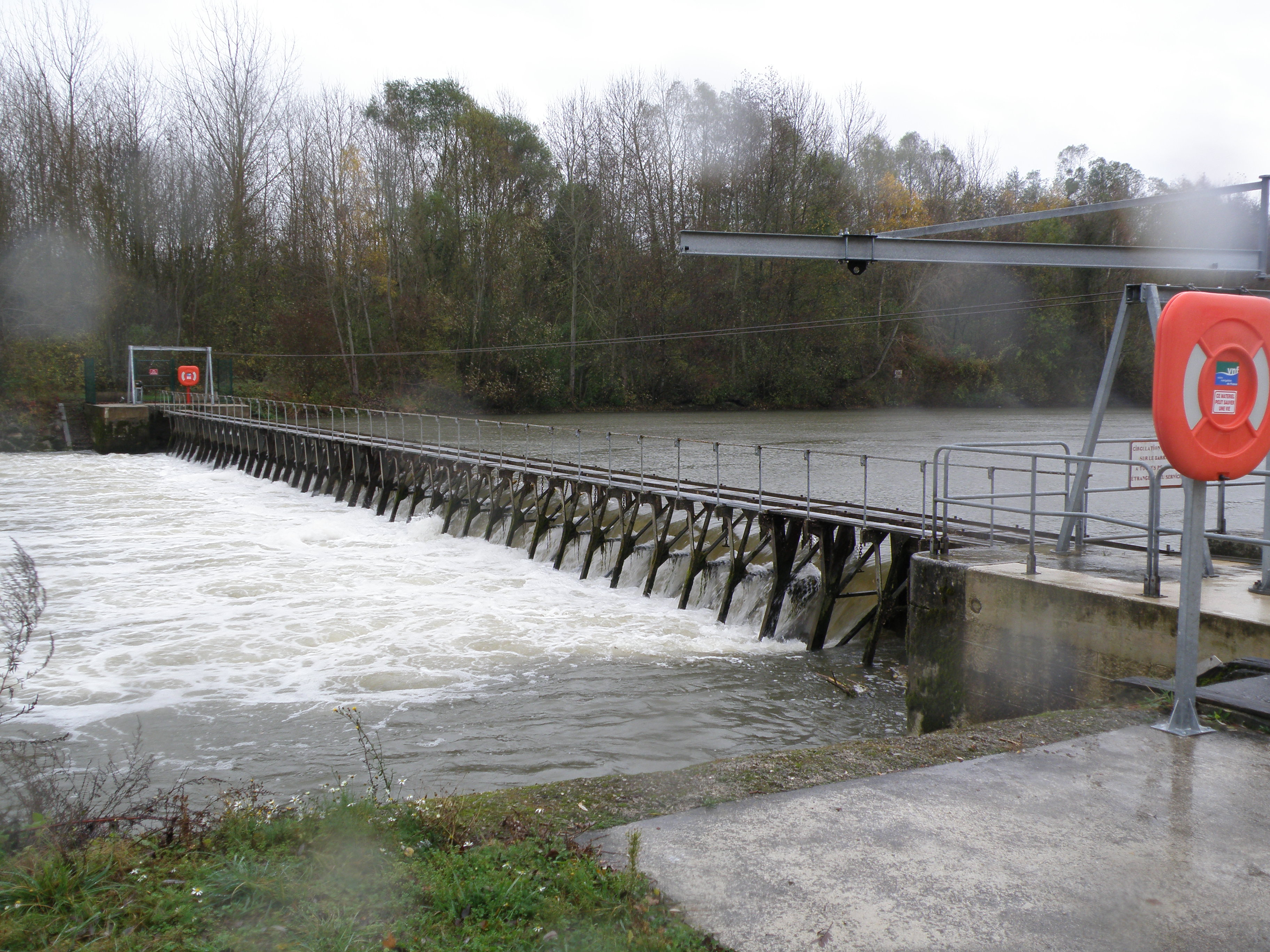
- The dam in Conflans-sur-Seine
- Location of Conflans-sur-Seine
- Location within France Location within Grand Est
- Coordinates: 48°33′05″N 3°40′48″E
- Country: France
- Region: Grand Est
- Department: Marne
- Arrondissement: Épernay
- Canton: Vertus-Plaine Champenoise
- Intercommunality: Sézanne-Sud Ouest Marnais

Government
  - Mayor (2020–2026): Jean-Paul Caccia
- Area^{1}: 6.14 km^{2} (2.37 sq mi)
- Elevation: 90 m (300 ft)
- Population (2023): 602
  - Density: 98.0/km^{2} (254/sq mi)
- Time zone: UTC+01:00 (CET)
  - Summer (DST): UTC+02:00 (CEST)
- INSEE/Postal code: 51162 /51260
- ^{1} French Land Register data, which excludes lakes, ponds, glaciers > 1 km^{2} (0.386 sq mi or 247 acres) and river estuaries.

Conflans-sur-Seine (French pronunciation: [kɔ̃flɑ̃ syʁ sɛn], literally Conflans on Seine, before 1962: Conflans) is a commune in the Marne department in north-eastern France.

== Demography ==
Historical population
Year	Pop.	±% p.a.
1968	611	—
1975	577	−0.81%
1982	579	+0.05%
1990	625	+0.96%
1999	664	+0.67%
2007	673	+0.17%
2012	674	+0.03%
2017	641	−1.00%
2023	602	−1.04%
Source: INSEE

== See also ==
- Communes of the Marne department
