= Saint-Quentin-le-Verger =

- Commune
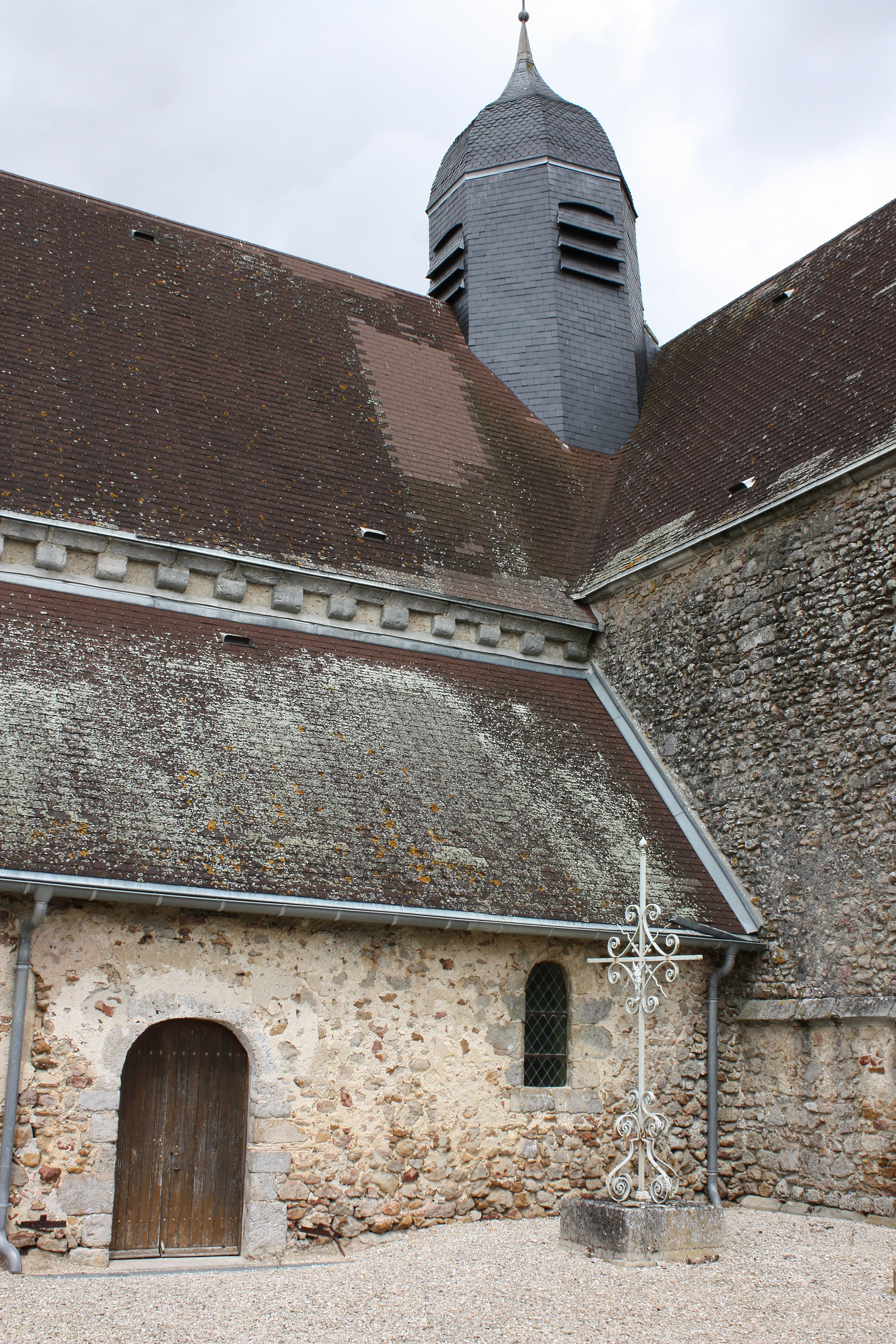
- The church in Saint-Quentin-le-Verger
- Location of Saint-Quentin-le-Verger
- Location within France Location within Grand Est
- Coordinates: 48°36′59″N 3°45′02″E
- Country: France
- Region: Grand Est
- Department: Marne
- Arrondissement: Épernay
- Canton: Vertus-Plaine Champenoise

Government
  - Mayor (2020–2026): Patricia Bertaut
- Area^{1}: 10.63 km^{2} (4.10 sq mi)
- Elevation: 86 m (282 ft)
- Population (2023): 112
  - Density: 10.5/km^{2} (27.3/sq mi)
- Time zone: UTC+01:00 (CET)
  - Summer (DST): UTC+02:00 (CEST)
- INSEE/Postal code: 51511 /51120
- ^{1} French Land Register data, which excludes lakes, ponds, glaciers > 1 km^{2} (0.386 sq mi or 247 acres) and river estuaries.

Saint-Quentin-le-Verger (French pronunciation: [sɛ̃ kɑ̃tɛ̃ lə vɛʁʒe]) is a commune in the Marne department in north-eastern France.

== See also ==
- Communes of the Marne department
