= Faux-Fresnay =

- Commune
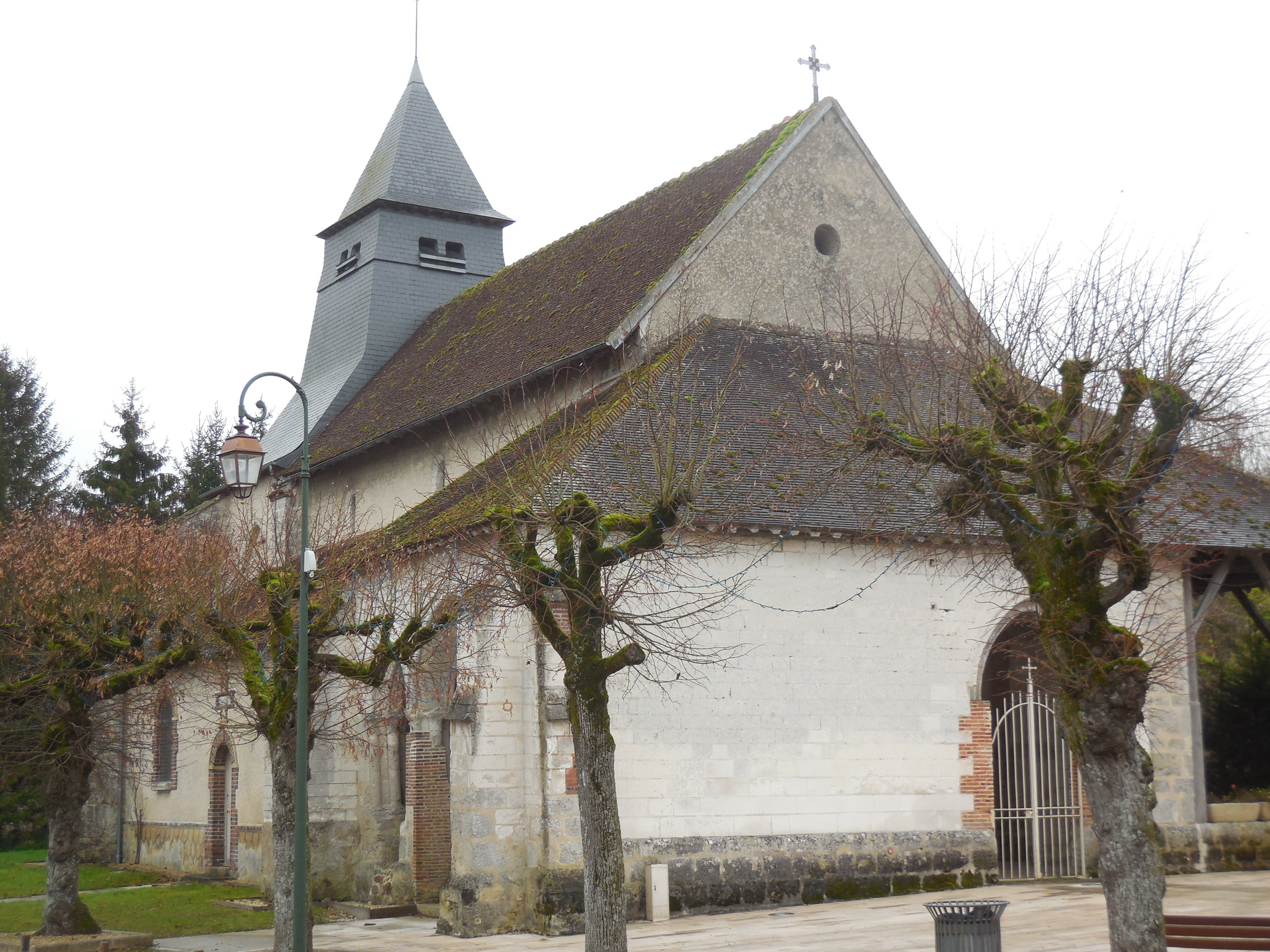
- The church in Faux-Fresnay

- Coat of arms
- Location of Faux-Fresnay
- Location within France Location within Grand Est
- Coordinates: 48°38′45″N 3°56′32″E
- Country: France
- Region: Grand Est
- Department: Marne
- Arrondissement: Épernay
- Canton: Vertus-Plaine Champenoise

Government
  - Mayor (2020–2026): Patrice Jacquet
- Area^{1}: 27.26 km^{2} (10.53 sq mi)
- Elevation: 91 m (299 ft)
- Population (2023): 343
  - Density: 12.6/km^{2} (32.6/sq mi)
- Time zone: UTC+01:00 (CET)
  - Summer (DST): UTC+02:00 (CEST)
- INSEE/Postal code: 51243 /51230
- ^{1} French Land Register data, which excludes lakes, ponds, glaciers > 1 km^{2} (0.386 sq mi or 247 acres) and river estuaries.

Faux-Fresnay (French pronunciation: [fo fʁɛnɛ]) is a commune in the Marne department in north-eastern France.

== See also ==
- Communes of the Marne department
