= Marigny, Marne =

Marigny
- Commune
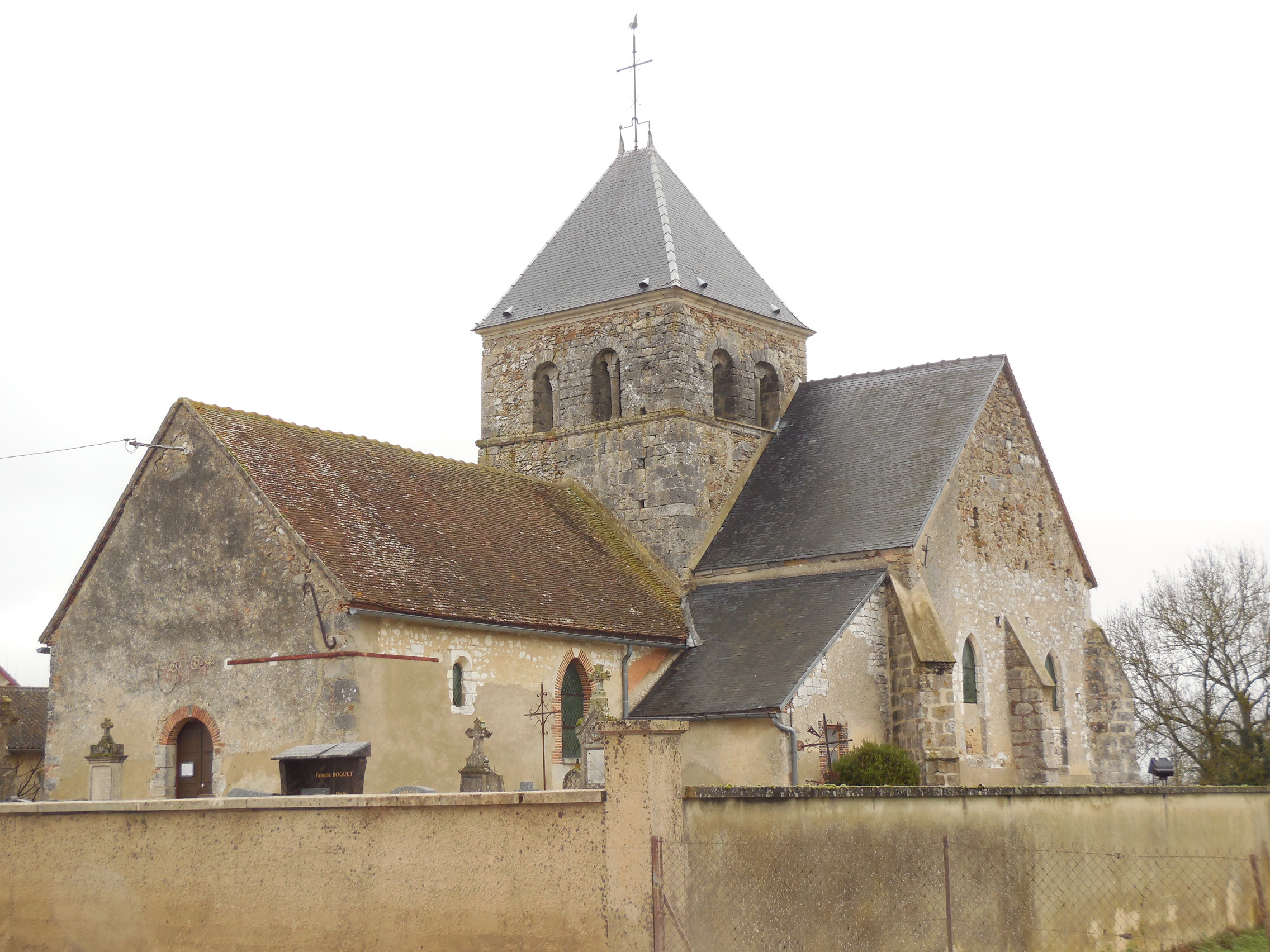
- The church in Marigny
- Location of Marigny
- Location within France Location within Grand Est
- Coordinates: 48°39′51″N 3°52′02″E
- Country: France
- Region: Grand Est
- Department: Marne
- Arrondissement: Épernay
- Canton: Vertus-Plaine Champenoise
- Intercommunality: Sud Marnais

Government
  - Mayor (2020–2026): Brice Bijot
- Area^{1}: 11.73 km^{2} (4.53 sq mi)
- Elevation: 88 m (289 ft)
- Population (2023): 108
  - Density: 9.21/km^{2} (23.8/sq mi)
- Time zone: UTC+01:00 (CET)
  - Summer (DST): UTC+02:00 (CEST)
- INSEE/Postal code: 51351 /51230
- ^{1} French Land Register data, which excludes lakes, ponds, glaciers > 1 km^{2} (0.386 sq mi or 247 acres) and river estuaries.

Marigny (French pronunciation: [maʁiɲi]) is a commune in the Marne department in north-eastern France.

== See also ==
- Communes of the Marne department
