= Ognes, Marne =

Ognes
- Commune
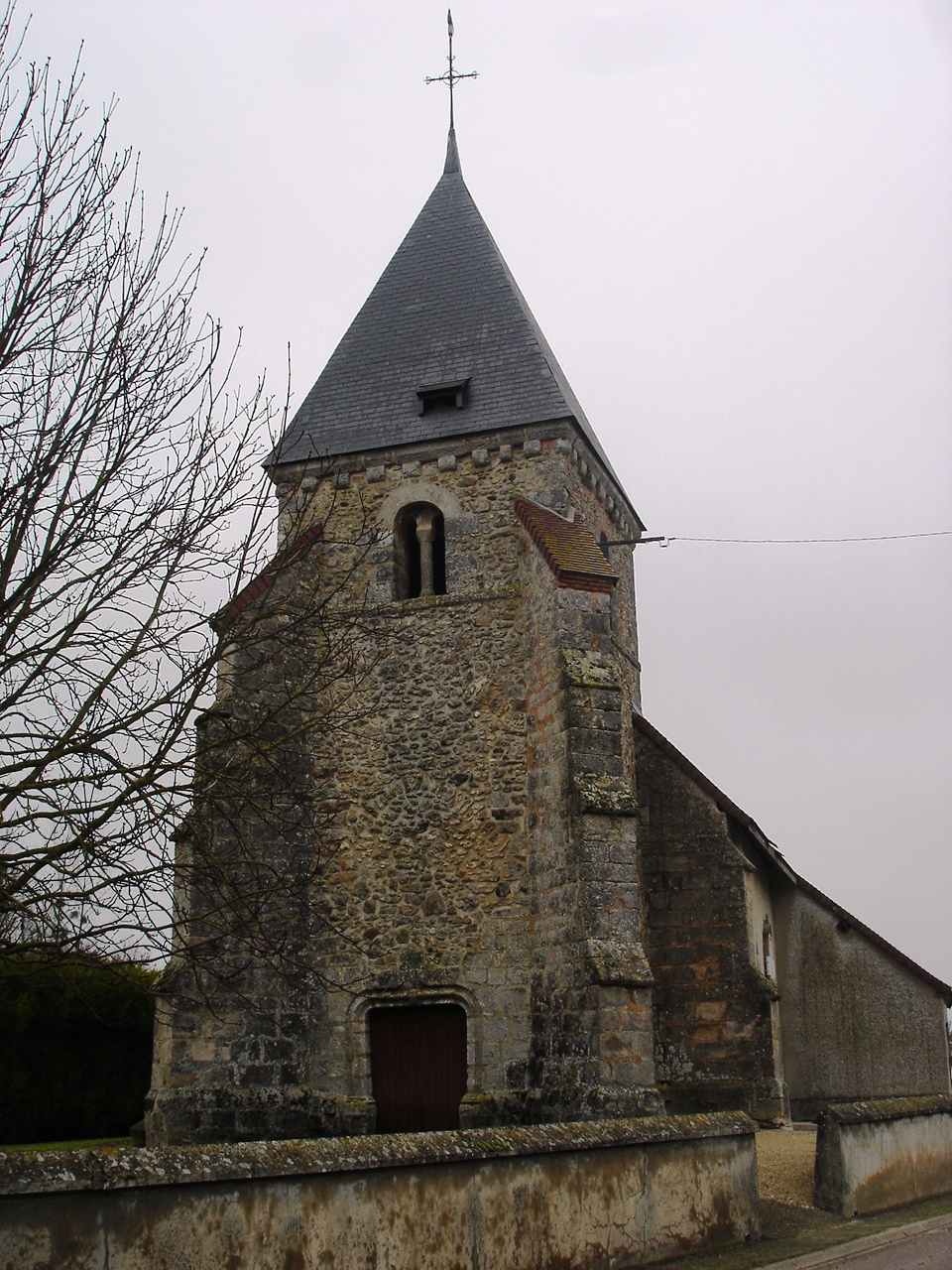
- The church in Ognes
- Location of Ognes
- Location within France Location within Grand Est
- Coordinates: 48°42′00″N 3°54′18″E
- Country: France
- Region: Grand Est
- Department: Marne
- Arrondissement: Épernay
- Canton: Vertus-Plaine Champenoise
- Intercommunality: Sud Marnais

Government
  - Mayor (2020–2026): Bernard Poirel
- Area^{1}: 7.79 km^{2} (3.01 sq mi)
- Elevation: 110 m (360 ft)
- Population (2023): 59
  - Density: 7.6/km^{2} (20/sq mi)
- Time zone: UTC+01:00 (CET)
  - Summer (DST): UTC+02:00 (CEST)
- INSEE/Postal code: 51412 /51230
- ^{1} French Land Register data, which excludes lakes, ponds, glaciers > 1 km^{2} (0.386 sq mi or 247 acres) and river estuaries.

Ognes (French pronunciation: [ɔɲ]) is a commune in the Marne department in north-eastern France.

== See also ==
- Communes of the Marne department
