= Thaas =

- Commune
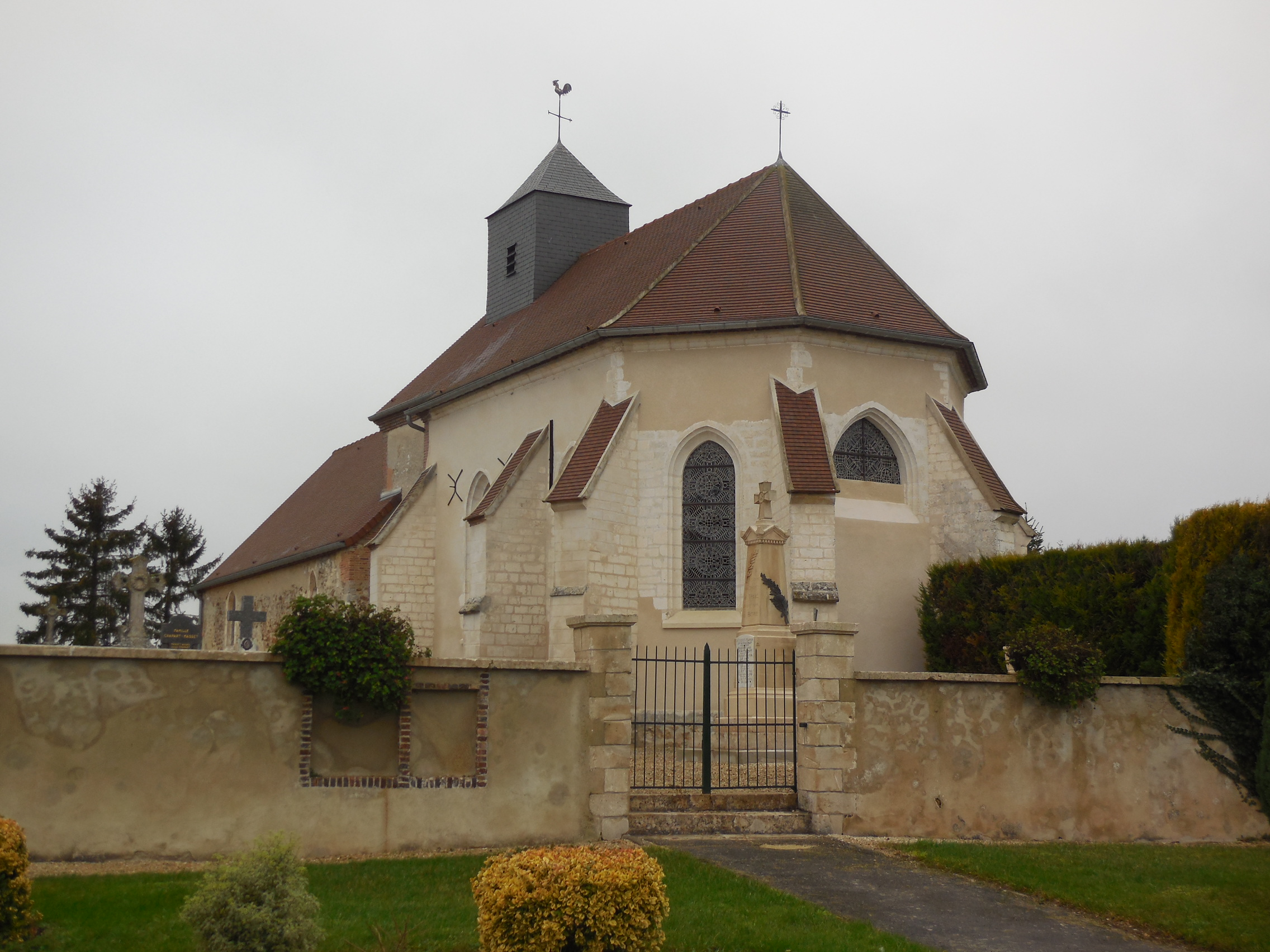
- The church in Thaas
- Location of Thaas
- Location within France Location within Grand Est
- Coordinates: 48°38′57″N 3°52′49″E
- Country: France
- Region: Grand Est
- Department: Marne
- Arrondissement: Épernay
- Canton: Vertus-Plaine Champenoise
- Intercommunality: Sud Marnais

Government
  - Mayor (2020–2026): Patrice Barbier
- Area^{1}: 10.47 km^{2} (4.04 sq mi)
- Elevation: 89 m (292 ft)
- Population (2023): 97
  - Density: 9.3/km^{2} (24/sq mi)
- Time zone: UTC+01:00 (CET)
  - Summer (DST): UTC+02:00 (CEST)
- INSEE/Postal code: 51565 /51230
- ^{1} French Land Register data, which excludes lakes, ponds, glaciers > 1 km^{2} (0.386 sq mi or 247 acres) and river estuaries.

Thaas is a commune in the Marne department in north-eastern France.

== See also ==
- Communes of the Marne department
