= Corroy, Marne =

Corroy
- Commune
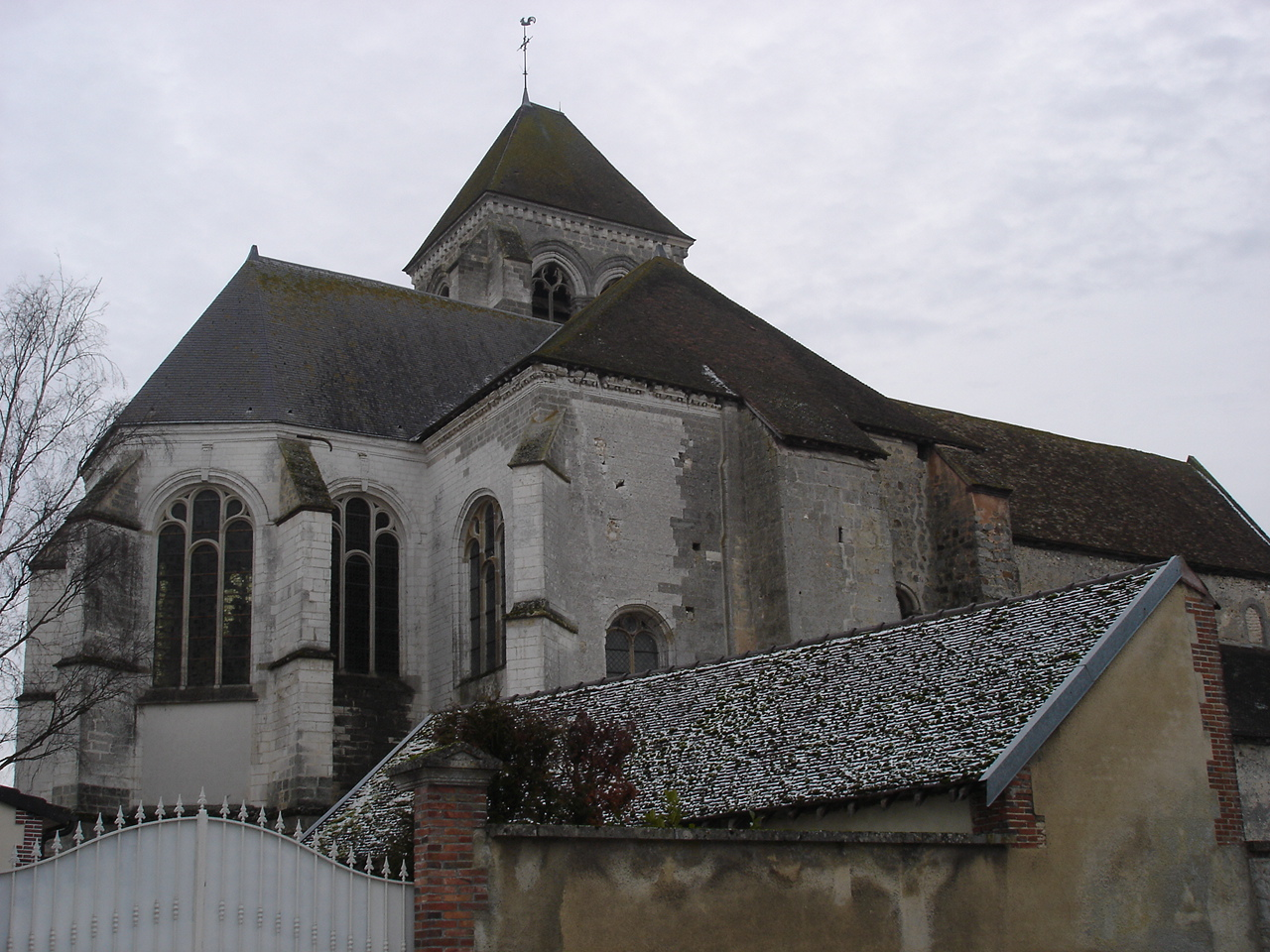
- The church in Corroy
- Location of Corroy
- Location within France Location within Grand Est
- Coordinates: 48°42′13″N 3°56′31″E
- Country: France
- Region: Grand Est
- Department: Marne
- Arrondissement: Épernay
- Canton: Vertus-Plaine Champenoise
- Intercommunality: Sud Marnais

Government
  - Mayor (2020–2026): Roland Boulard
- Area^{1}: 19.97 km^{2} (7.71 sq mi)
- Elevation: 97 m (318 ft)
- Population (2023): 147
  - Density: 7.36/km^{2} (19.1/sq mi)
- Time zone: UTC+01:00 (CET)
  - Summer (DST): UTC+02:00 (CEST)
- INSEE/Postal code: 51176 /51230
- ^{1} French Land Register data, which excludes lakes, ponds, glaciers > 1 km^{2} (0.386 sq mi or 247 acres) and river estuaries.

Corroy (French pronunciation: [kɔʁwa]) is a commune in the Marne department in north-eastern France.

== See also ==
- Communes of the Marne department
