= Pleurs =

- Commune
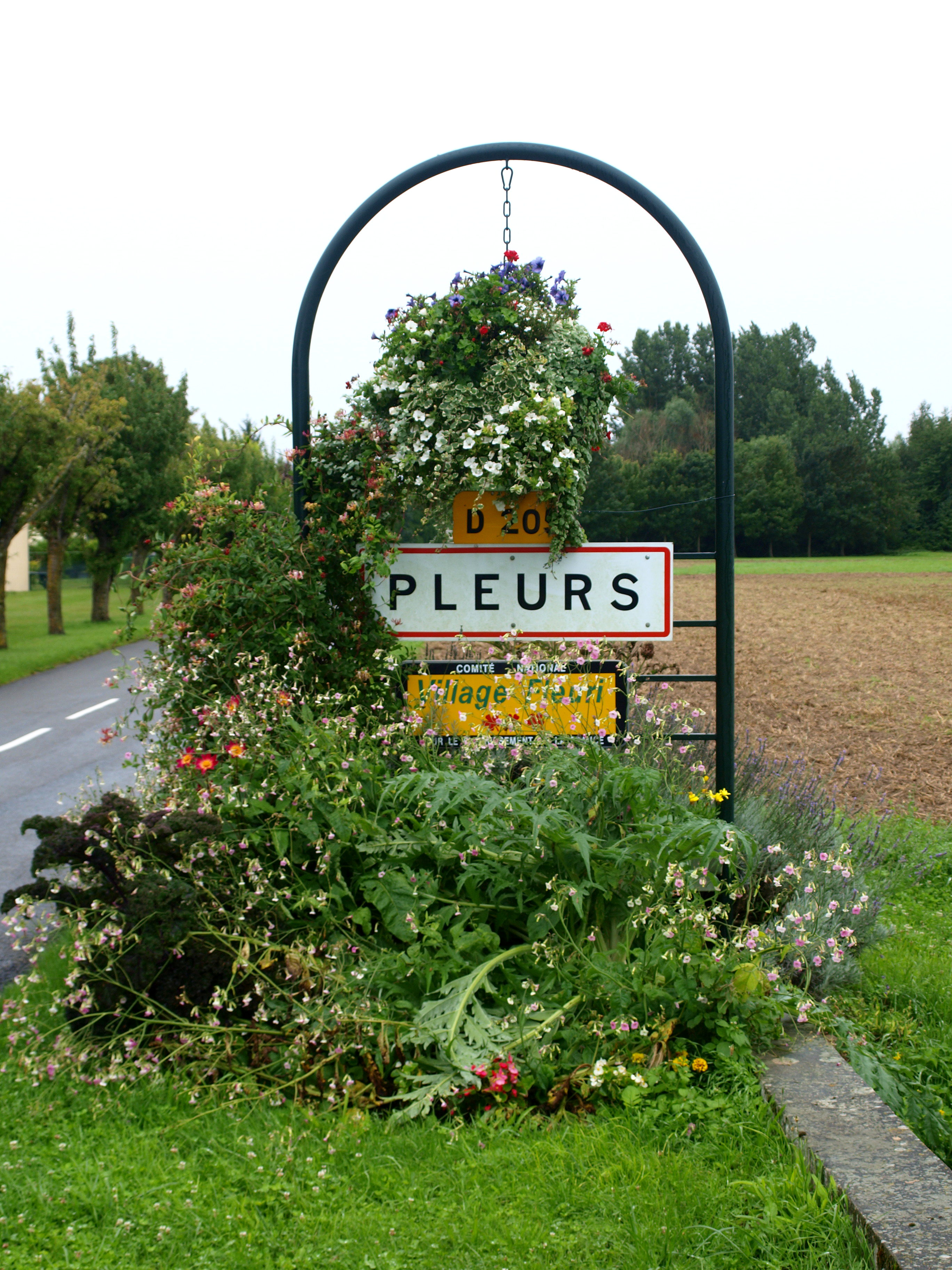
- A roadsign on entering Pleurs

- Coat of arms
- Location of Pleurs
- Location within France Location within Grand Est
- Coordinates: 48°41′29″N 3°52′18″E
- Country: France
- Region: Grand Est
- Department: Marne
- Arrondissement: Reims
- Canton: Vertus-Plaine Champenoise
- Intercommunality: Sud Marnais

Government
  - Mayor (2020–2026): Janick Simonnet
- Area^{1}: 16.72 km^{2} (6.46 sq mi)
- Elevation: 95 m (312 ft)
- Population (2023): 825
  - Density: 49.3/km^{2} (128/sq mi)
- Time zone: UTC+01:00 (CET)
  - Summer (DST): UTC+02:00 (CEST)
- INSEE/Postal code: 51432 /51230
- ^{1} French Land Register data, which excludes lakes, ponds, glaciers > 1 km^{2} (0.386 sq mi or 247 acres) and river estuaries.

Pleurs (French pronunciation: [plœʁ]) is a commune in the Marne department in north-eastern France.

== See also ==
- Communes of the Marne department
