= Reuves =

- Commune
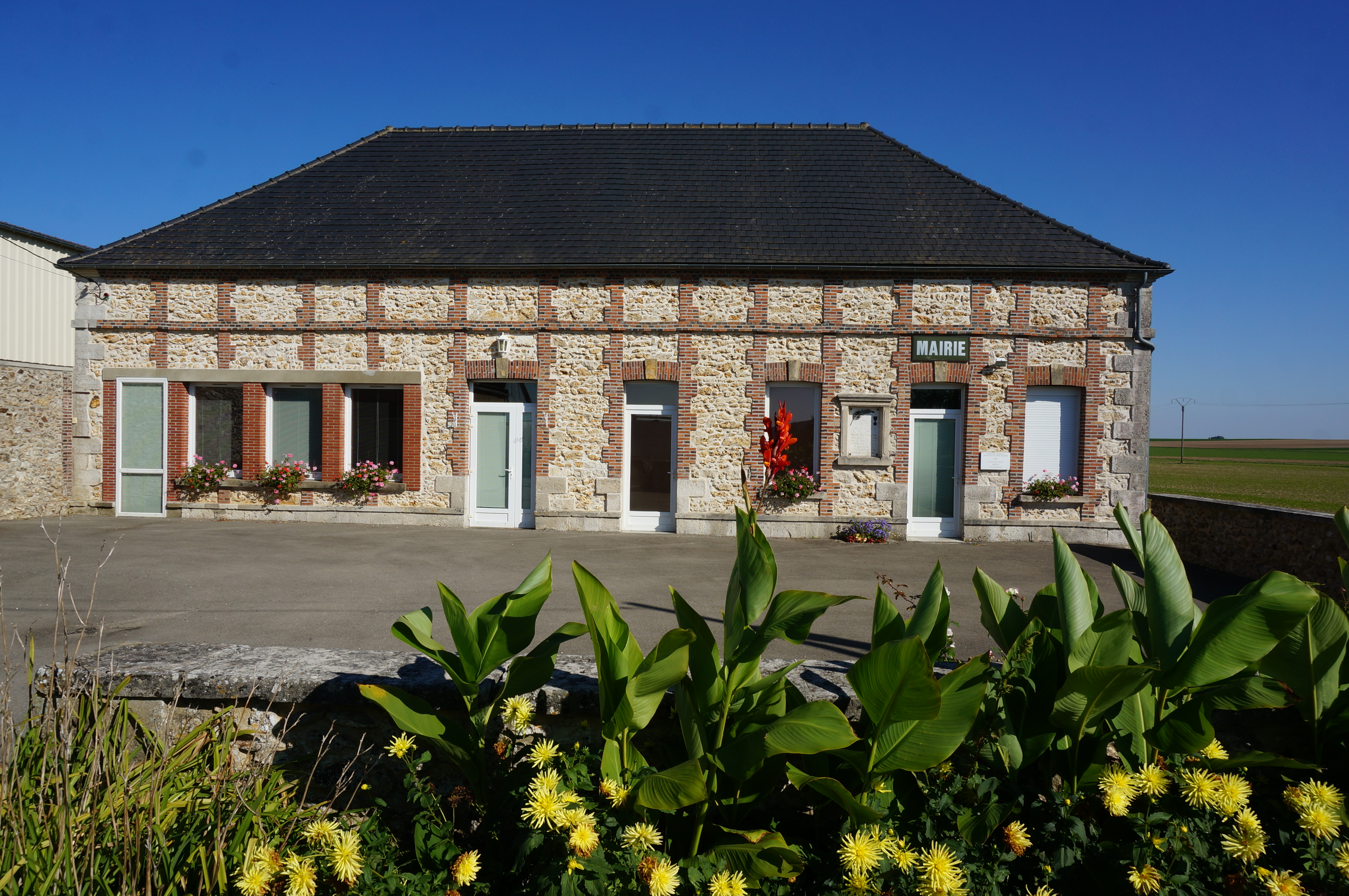
- The town hall in Reuves
- Location of Reuves
- Location within France Location within Grand Est
- Coordinates: 48°47′45″N 3°48′10″E
- Country: France
- Region: Grand Est
- Department: Marne
- Arrondissement: Épernay
- Canton: Sézanne-Brie et Champagne
- Intercommunality: Sézanne-Sud Ouest Marnais

Government
  - Mayor (2020–2026): Marie-Claude Dupont
- Area^{1}: 6.4 km^{2} (2.5 sq mi)
- Elevation: 163 m (535 ft)
- Population (2023): 59
  - Density: 9.2/km^{2} (24/sq mi)
- Time zone: UTC+01:00 (CET)
  - Summer (DST): UTC+02:00 (CEST)
- INSEE/Postal code: 51458 /51120
- ^{1} French Land Register data, which excludes lakes, ponds, glaciers > 1 km^{2} (0.386 sq mi or 247 acres) and river estuaries.

Reuves (French pronunciation: [ʁœv]) is a commune in the Marne department in north-eastern France.

== Population ==
Historical population
Year	Pop.	±% p.a.
1968	72	—
1975	63	−1.89%
1982	70	+1.52%
1990	75	+0.87%
1999	68	−1.08%
2007	61	−1.35%
2012	67	+1.89%
2017	71	+1.17%
2023	59	−3.04%
Source: INSEE

== See also ==
- Communes of the Marne department
