= Linthelles =

- Commune
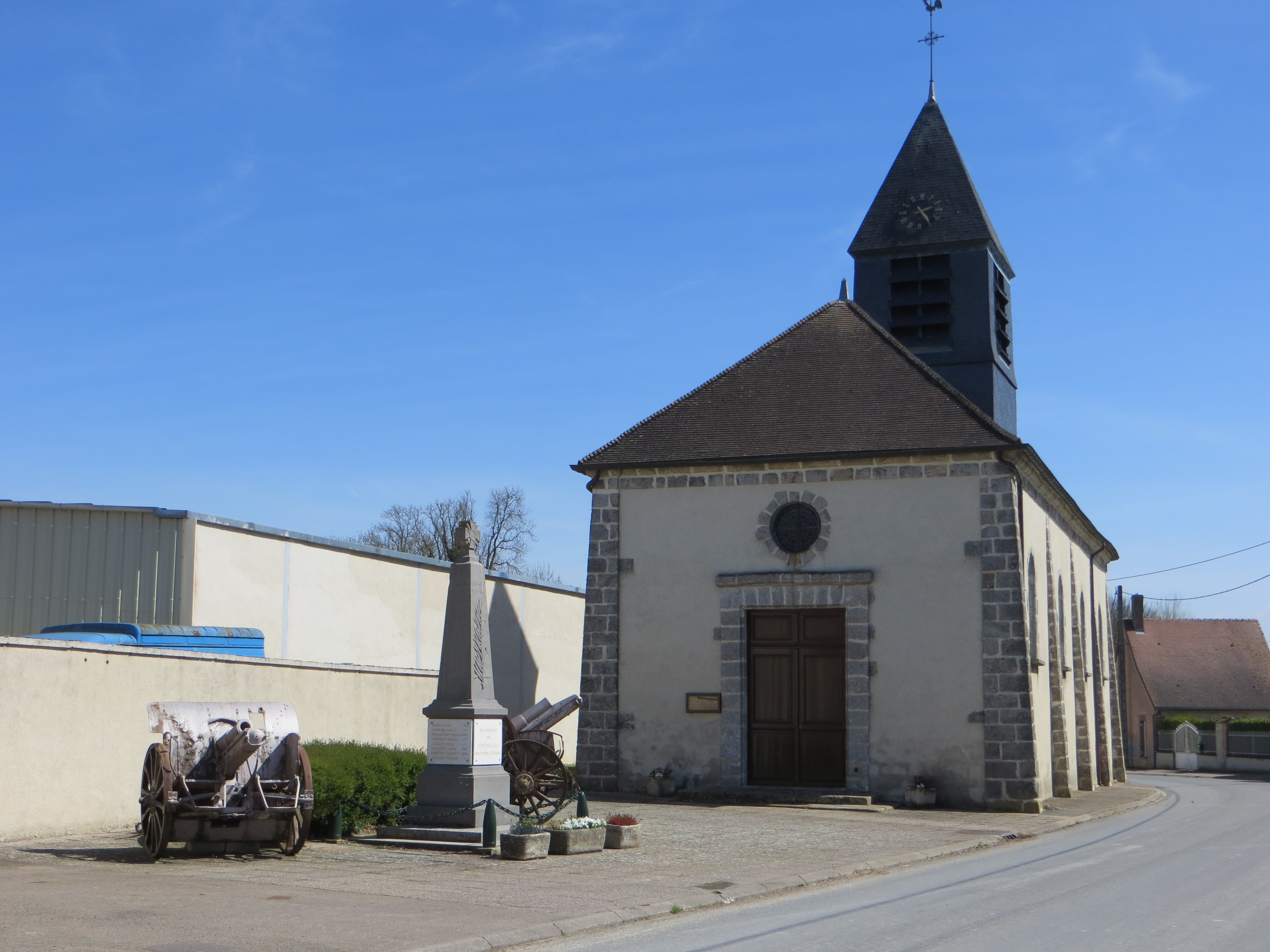
- The war memorial and church in Linthelles

- Coat of arms
- Location of Linthelles
- Location within France Location within Grand Est
- Coordinates: 48°43′02″N 3°49′23″E
- Country: France
- Region: Grand Est
- Department: Marne
- Arrondissement: Épernay
- Canton: Sézanne-Brie et Champagne

Government
  - Mayor (2020–2026): Thierry Dupont
- Area^{1}: 11.02 km^{2} (4.25 sq mi)
- Elevation: 104 m (341 ft)
- Population (2023): 103
  - Density: 9.35/km^{2} (24.2/sq mi)
- Time zone: UTC+01:00 (CET)
  - Summer (DST): UTC+02:00 (CEST)
- INSEE/Postal code: 51323 /51230
- ^{1} French Land Register data, which excludes lakes, ponds, glaciers > 1 km^{2} (0.386 sq mi or 247 acres) and river estuaries.

Linthelles (French pronunciation: [lɛ̃tɛl]) is a commune in the Marne department in north-eastern France.

== See also ==
- Communes of the Marne department
