= Chichey =

- Commune
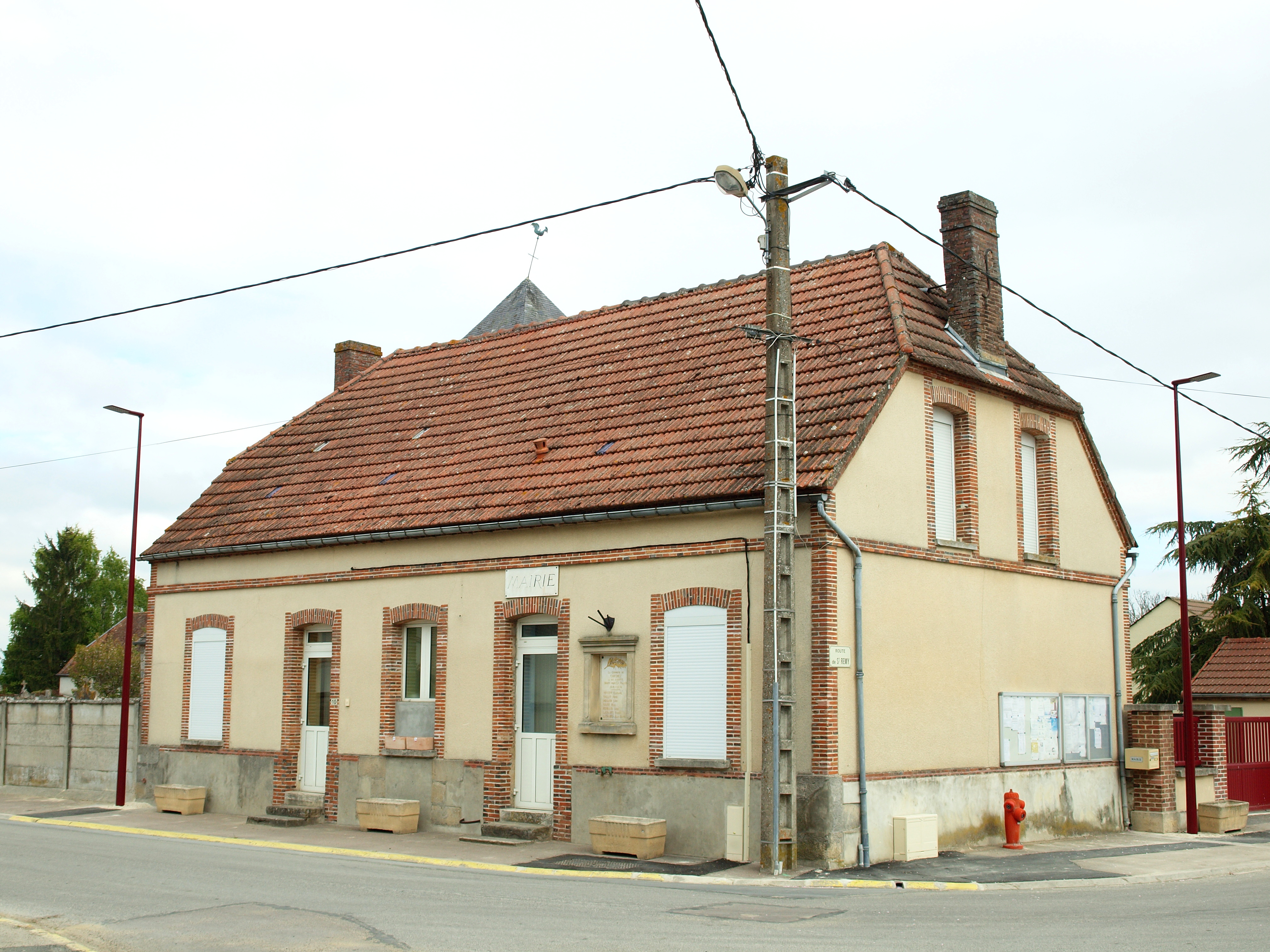
- The town hall in Chichey
- Location of Chichey
- Location within France Location within Grand Est
- Coordinates: 48°41′23″N 3°45′26″E
- Country: France
- Region: Grand Est
- Department: Marne
- Arrondissement: Épernay
- Canton: Sézanne-Brie et Champagne

Government
  - Mayor (2020–2026): Thierry Ferrand
- Area^{1}: 7.4 km^{2} (2.9 sq mi)
- Elevation: 120 m (390 ft)
- Population (2023): 166
  - Density: 22/km^{2} (58/sq mi)
- Time zone: UTC+01:00 (CET)
  - Summer (DST): UTC+02:00 (CEST)
- INSEE/Postal code: 51151 /51120
- ^{1} French Land Register data, which excludes lakes, ponds, glaciers > 1 km^{2} (0.386 sq mi or 247 acres) and river estuaries.

Chichey (French pronunciation: [ʃiʃɛ]) is a commune in the Marne department in north-eastern France.

== See also ==
- Communes of the Marne department
