= La Forestière =

- Commune
- Location of La Forestière
- Location within France Location within Grand Est
- Coordinates: 48°39′28″N 3°35′37″E
- Country: France
- Region: Grand Est
- Department: Marne
- Arrondissement: Épernay
- Canton: Sézanne-Brie et Champagne
- Intercommunality: Sézanne-Sud Ouest Marnais

Government
  - Mayor (2020–2026): Patrick Pierrat
- Area^{1}: 22.67 km^{2} (8.75 sq mi)
- Elevation: 171 m (561 ft)
- Population (2023): 209
  - Density: 9.22/km^{2} (23.9/sq mi)
- Time zone: UTC+01:00 (CET)
  - Summer (DST): UTC+02:00 (CEST)
- INSEE/Postal code: 51258 /51120
- ^{1} French Land Register data, which excludes lakes, ponds, glaciers > 1 km^{2} (0.386 sq mi or 247 acres) and river estuaries.

La Forestière (French pronunciation: [la fɔʁɛstjɛʁ]) is a commune in the Marne department in north-eastern France.

== See also ==
- Communes of the Marne department
