= Péas =

- Commune
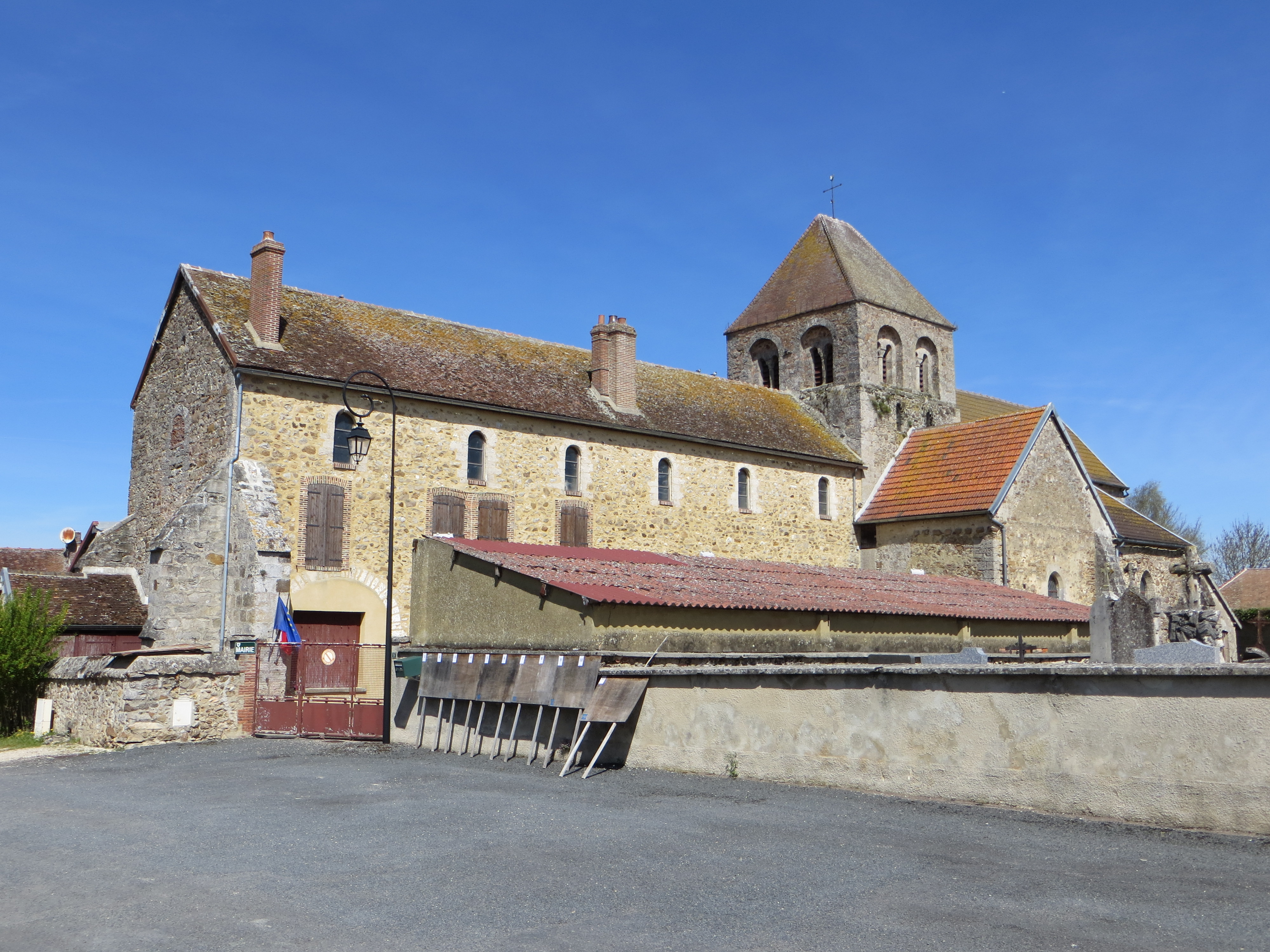
- The church in Péas
- Location of Péas
- Location within France Location within Grand Est
- Coordinates: 48°44′36″N 3°46′45″E
- Country: France
- Region: Grand Est
- Department: Marne
- Arrondissement: Épernay
- Canton: Sézanne-Brie et Champagne

Government
  - Mayor (2020–2026): Noël Maury
- Area^{1}: 7.69 km^{2} (2.97 sq mi)
- Elevation: 132 m (433 ft)
- Population (2023): 65
  - Density: 8.5/km^{2} (22/sq mi)
- Time zone: UTC+01:00 (CET)
  - Summer (DST): UTC+02:00 (CEST)
- INSEE/Postal code: 51426 /51120
- ^{1} French Land Register data, which excludes lakes, ponds, glaciers > 1 km^{2} (0.386 sq mi or 247 acres) and river estuaries.

Péas is a commune in the Marne department in north-eastern France.

== See also ==
- Communes of the Marne department
