= Saudoy =

- Commune
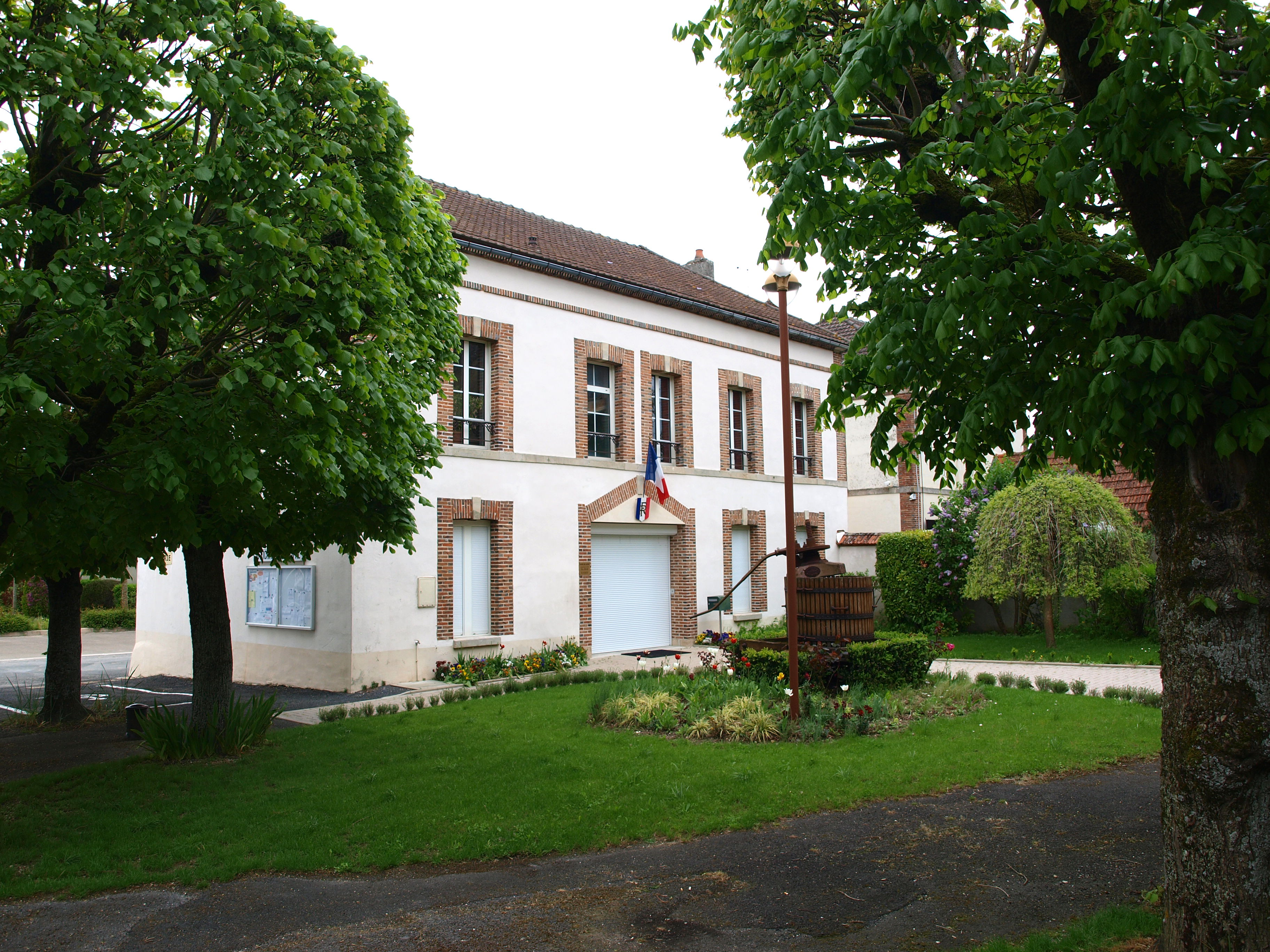
- The town hall in Saudoy
- Location of Saudoy
- Location within France Location within Grand Est
- Coordinates: 48°40′55″N 3°43′01″E
- Country: France
- Region: Grand Est
- Department: Marne
- Arrondissement: Épernay
- Canton: Sézanne-Brie et Champagne

Government
  - Mayor (2020–2026): Jean-Christophe Léglantier
- Area^{1}: 12.66 km^{2} (4.89 sq mi)
- Elevation: 111 m (364 ft)
- Population (2023): 377
  - Density: 29.8/km^{2} (77.1/sq mi)
- Time zone: UTC+01:00 (CET)
  - Summer (DST): UTC+02:00 (CEST)
- INSEE/Postal code: 51526 /51120
- ^{1} French Land Register data, which excludes lakes, ponds, glaciers > 1 km^{2} (0.386 sq mi or 247 acres) and river estuaries.

Saudoy (French pronunciation: [sodwa]) is a commune in the Marne department in north-eastern France.

== See also ==
- Communes of the Marne department
