= Neuvy, Marne =

Neuvy
- Commune
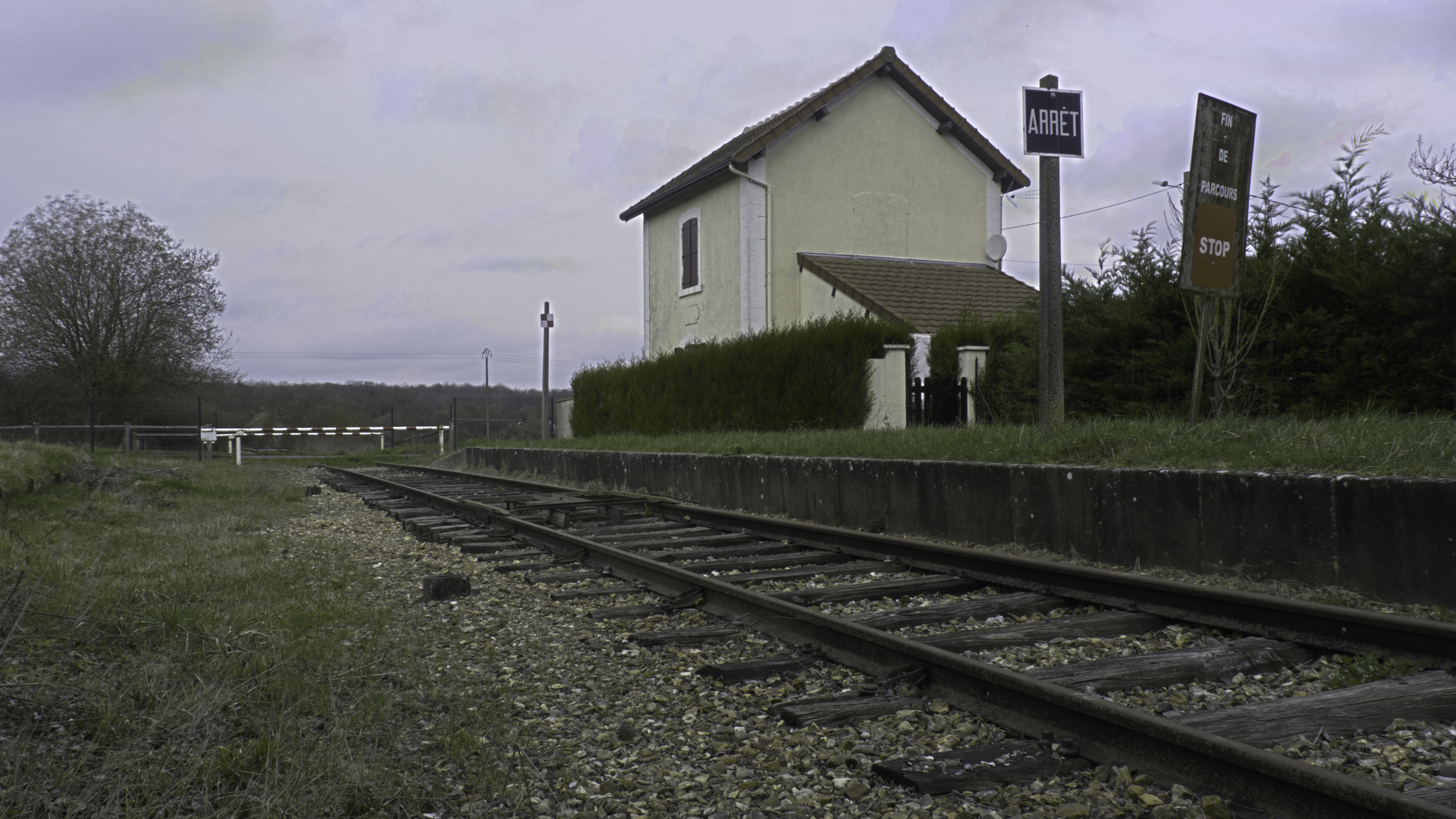
- The railway station in Neuvy
- Location of Neuvy
- Location within France Location within Grand Est
- Coordinates: 48°44′48″N 3°31′12″E
- Country: France
- Region: Grand Est
- Department: Marne
- Arrondissement: Épernay
- Canton: Sézanne-Brie et Champagne
- Intercommunality: Sézanne-Sud Ouest Marnais

Government
  - Mayor (2020–2026): Guy Degois
- Area^{1}: 17.11 km^{2} (6.61 sq mi)
- Elevation: 171 m (561 ft)
- Population (2023): 274
  - Density: 16.0/km^{2} (41.5/sq mi)
- Time zone: UTC+01:00 (CET)
  - Summer (DST): UTC+02:00 (CEST)
- INSEE/Postal code: 51402 /51310
- ^{1} French Land Register data, which excludes lakes, ponds, glaciers > 1 km^{2} (0.386 sq mi or 247 acres) and river estuaries.

Neuvy (French pronunciation: [nøvi]) is a commune in the Marne department in north-eastern France.

== Population ==
Historical population
Year	Pop.	±% p.a.
1968	192	—
1975	174	−1.40%
1982	108	−6.59%
1990	151	+4.28%
1999	158	+0.50%
2007	210	+3.62%
2012	231	+1.92%
2017	255	+2.00%
2023	274	+1.20%
Source: INSEE

== See also ==
- Communes of the Marne department
