= Lachy, Marne =

Lachy
- Commune
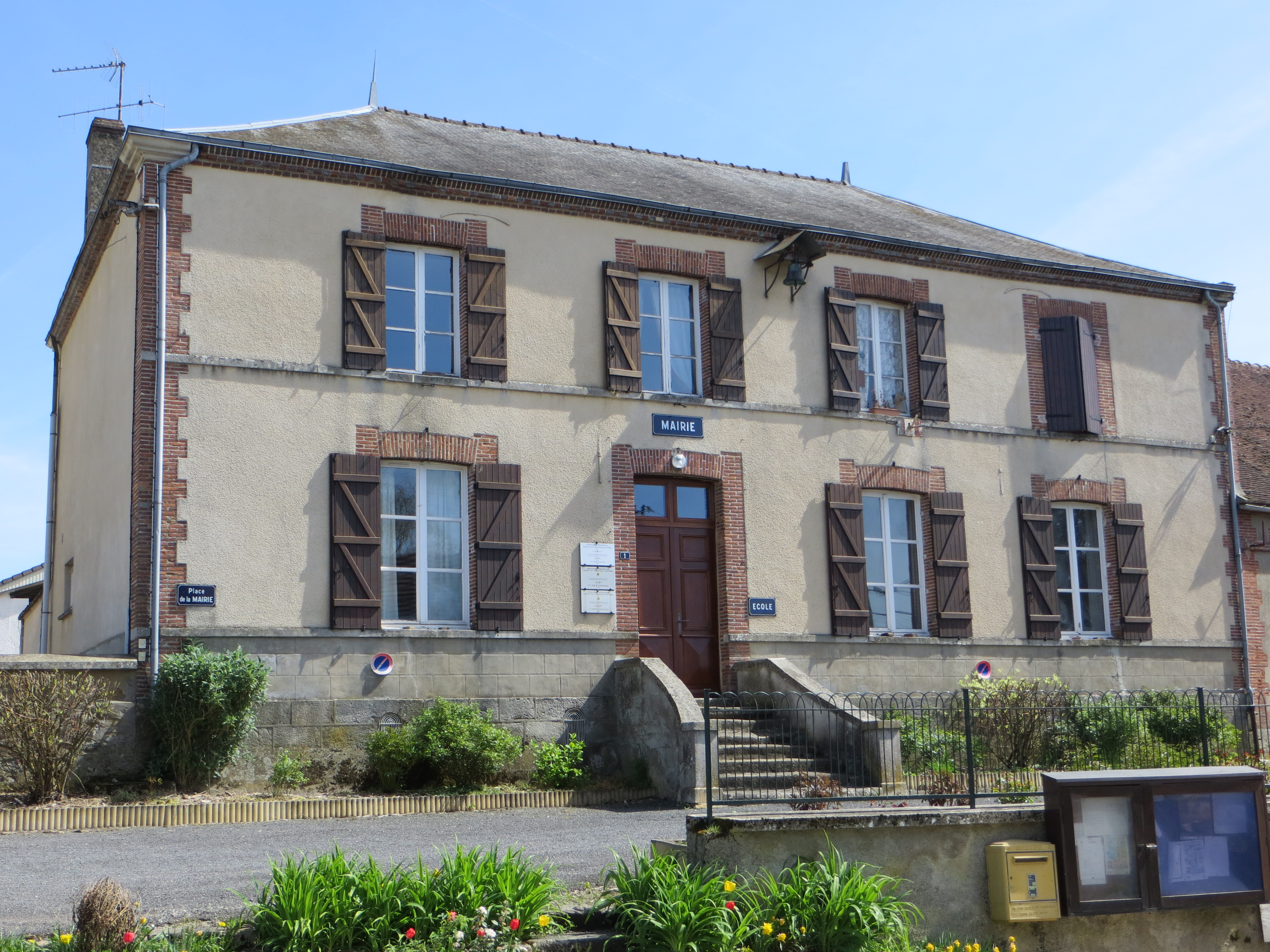
- The town hall in Lachy

- Coat of arms
- Location of Lachy
- Location within France Location within Grand Est
- Coordinates: 48°46′10″N 3°42′28″E
- Country: France
- Region: Grand Est
- Department: Marne
- Arrondissement: Épernay
- Canton: Sézanne-Brie et Champagne

Government
  - Mayor (2020–2026): Christophe Zbinden
- Area^{1}: 16.89 km^{2} (6.52 sq mi)
- Elevation: 190 m (620 ft)
- Population (2023): 345
  - Density: 20.4/km^{2} (52.9/sq mi)
- Time zone: UTC+01:00 (CET)
  - Summer (DST): UTC+02:00 (CEST)
- INSEE/Postal code: 51313 /51120
- ^{1} French Land Register data, which excludes lakes, ponds, glaciers > 1 km^{2} (0.386 sq mi or 247 acres) and river estuaries.

Lachy (French pronunciation: [laʃi]) is a commune in the Marne department in north-eastern France.

== See also ==
- Communes of the Marne department
