= Joiselle =

- Commune
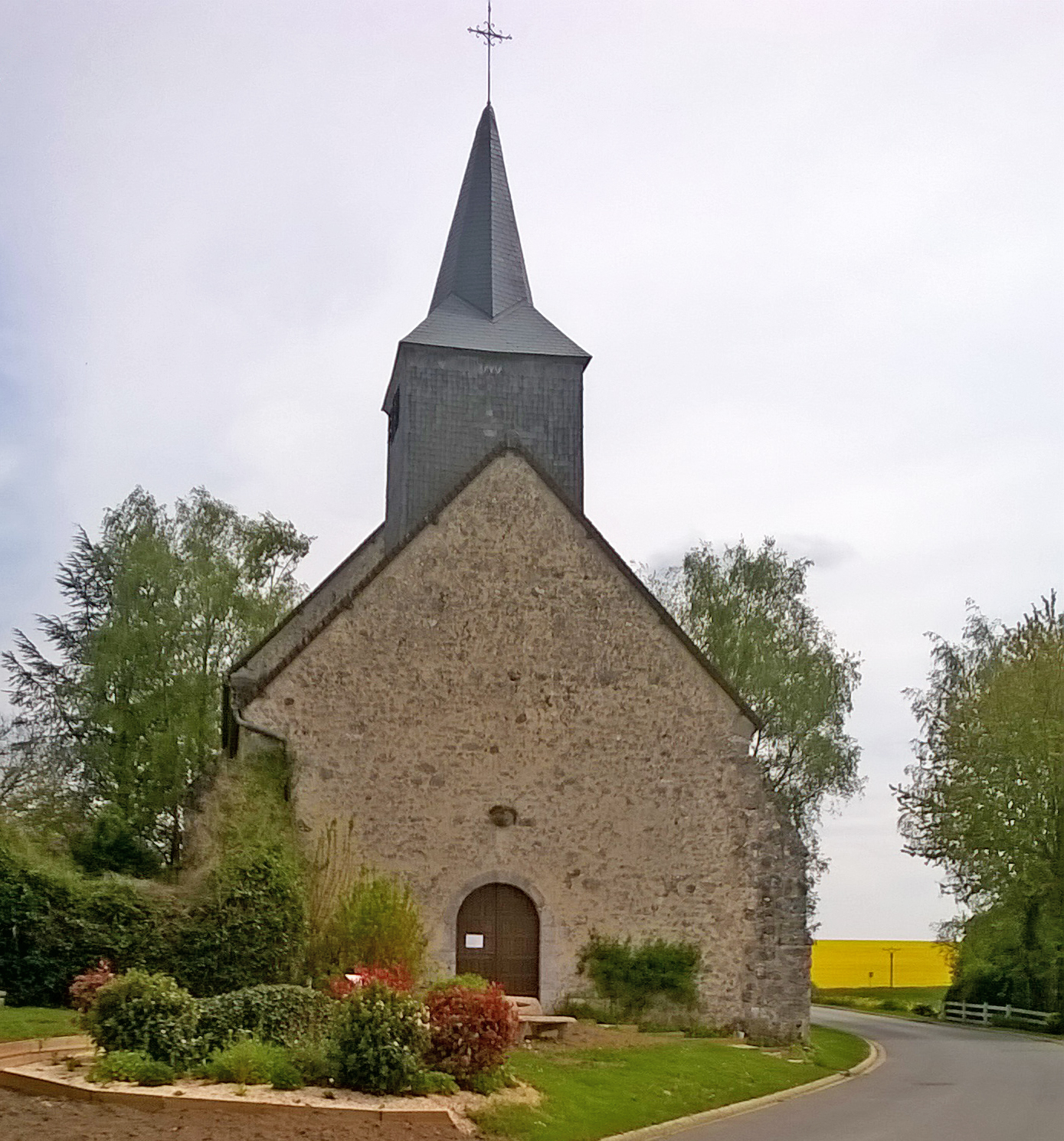
- The church in Joiselle
- Location of Joiselle
- Location within France Location within Grand Est
- Coordinates: 48°46′17″N 3°31′02″E
- Country: France
- Region: Grand Est
- Department: Marne
- Arrondissement: Épernay
- Canton: Sézanne-Brie et Champagne
- Intercommunality: Sézanne-Sud Ouest Marnais

Government
  - Mayor (2020–2026): Jean-Claude Brochot
- Area^{1}: 9.76 km^{2} (3.77 sq mi)
- Elevation: 138 m (453 ft)
- Population (2023): 110
  - Density: 11/km^{2} (29/sq mi)
- Time zone: UTC+01:00 (CET)
  - Summer (DST): UTC+02:00 (CEST)
- INSEE/Postal code: 51306 /51310
- ^{1} French Land Register data, which excludes lakes, ponds, glaciers > 1 km^{2} (0.386 sq mi or 247 acres) and river estuaries.

Joiselle (French pronunciation: [ʒwazɛl]) is a commune in the Marne department in north-eastern France.

== See also ==
- Communes of the Marne department
