= Broussy-le-Petit =

- Commune
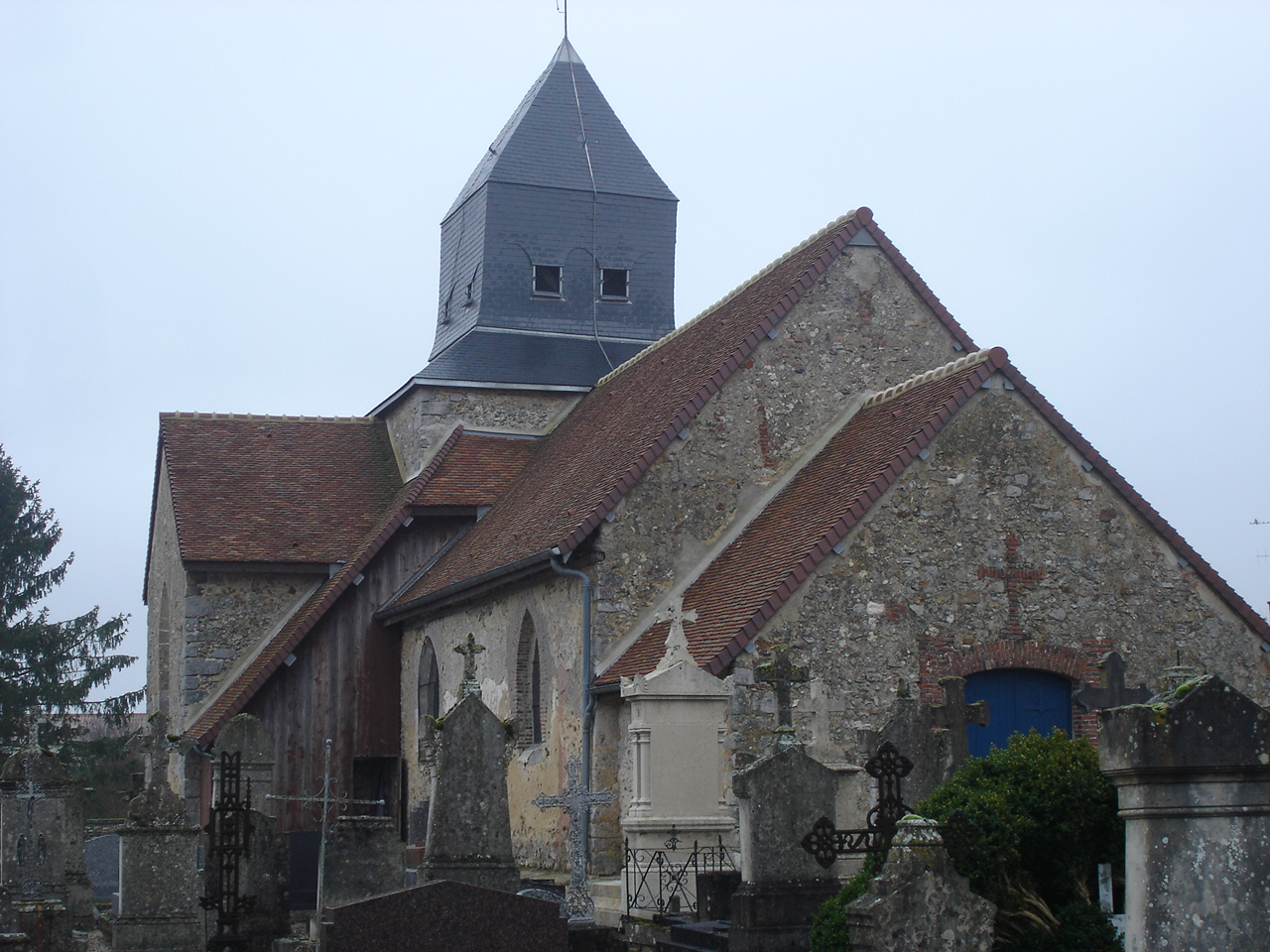
- The church in Broussy-le-Petit
- Location of Broussy-le-Petit
- Location within France Location within Grand Est
- Coordinates: 48°47′34″N 3°49′38″E
- Country: France
- Region: Grand Est
- Department: Marne
- Arrondissement: Épernay
- Canton: Sézanne-Brie et Champagne

Government
  - Mayor (2020–2026): Nicolas Coutenceau
- Area^{1}: 11.62 km^{2} (4.49 sq mi)
- Elevation: 152 m (499 ft)
- Population (2023): 136
  - Density: 11.7/km^{2} (30.3/sq mi)
- Time zone: UTC+01:00 (CET)
  - Summer (DST): UTC+02:00 (CEST)
- INSEE/Postal code: 51091 /51230
- ^{1} French Land Register data, which excludes lakes, ponds, glaciers > 1 km^{2} (0.386 sq mi or 247 acres) and river estuaries.

Broussy-le-Petit (French pronunciation: [bʁusi lə pəti]) is a commune in the Marne department in northeastern France.

== Population ==
Historical population
| Year | Pop. | ±% p.a. |
|---|---|---|
| 1968 | 146 | — |
| 1975 | 125 | −2.19% |
| 1982 | 147 | +2.34% |
| 1990 | 158 | +0.91% |
| 1999 | 135 | −1.73% |
| 2007 | 145 | +0.90% |
| 2012 | 128 | −2.46% |
| 2017 | 129 | +0.16% |
| 2023 | 136 | +0.88% |
Source: INSEE

== See also ==
- Communes of the Marne department
