= Tréfols =

- Commune
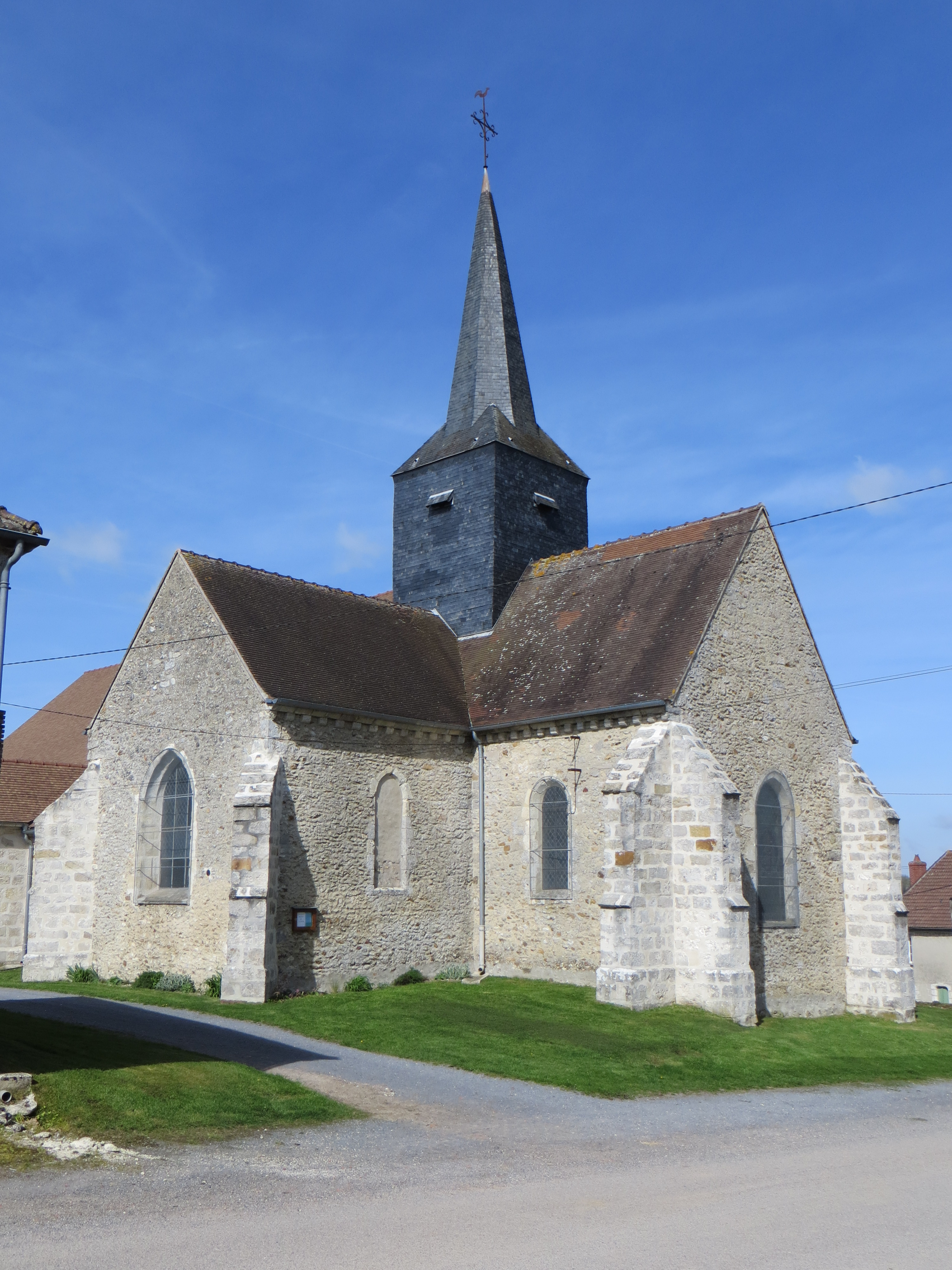
- The church in Tréfols
- Location of Tréfols
- Location within France Location within Grand Est
- Coordinates: 48°47′21″N 3°29′58″E
- Country: France
- Region: Grand Est
- Department: Marne
- Arrondissement: Épernay
- Canton: Sézanne-Brie et Champagne
- Intercommunality: Brie Champenoise

Government
  - Mayor (2020–2026): Patrick Vié
- Area^{1}: 14.39 km^{2} (5.56 sq mi)
- Elevation: 175 m (574 ft)
- Population (2023): 169
  - Density: 11.7/km^{2} (30.4/sq mi)
- Time zone: UTC+01:00 (CET)
  - Summer (DST): UTC+02:00 (CEST)
- INSEE/Postal code: 51579 /51210
- ^{1} French Land Register data, which excludes lakes, ponds, glaciers > 1 km^{2} (0.386 sq mi or 247 acres) and river estuaries.

Tréfols (French pronunciation: [tʁefɔl]) is a commune in the Marne department in north-eastern France.

== See also ==
- Communes of the Marne department
