= Saint-Bon =

- Commune
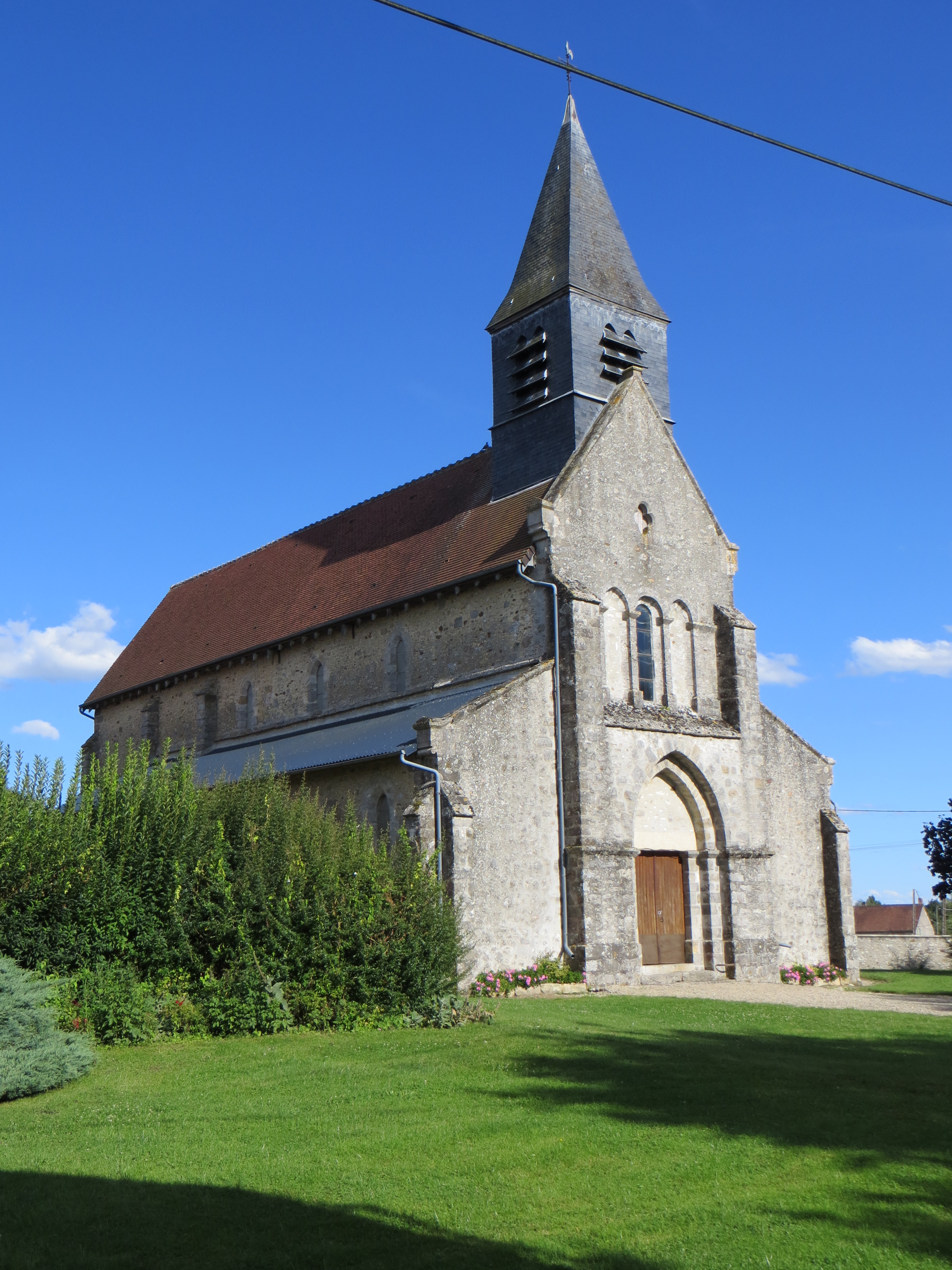
- The church in Saint-Bon
- Location of Saint-Bon
- Location within France Location within Grand Est
- Coordinates: 48°40′43″N 3°27′44″E
- Country: France
- Region: Grand Est
- Department: Marne
- Arrondissement: Épernay
- Canton: Sézanne-Brie et Champagne

Government
  - Mayor (2020–2026): Jean-Pierre Verhaegen
- Area^{1}: 8 km^{2} (3.1 sq mi)
- Elevation: 182 m (597 ft)
- Population (2023): 91
  - Density: 11/km^{2} (29/sq mi)
- Time zone: UTC+01:00 (CET)
  - Summer (DST): UTC+02:00 (CEST)
- INSEE/Postal code: 51473 /51310
- ^{1} French Land Register data, which excludes lakes, ponds, glaciers > 1 km^{2} (0.386 sq mi or 247 acres) and river estuaries.

Saint-Bon (French pronunciation: [sɛ̃ bɔ̃]) is a commune in the Marne department in north-eastern France.

== See also ==
- Communes of the Marne department
