= Canton of Sézanne-Brie et Champagne =

Canton of France

Coordinates: 48.72°N 3.72°E

The canton of Sézanne-Brie et Champagne is an administrative division of the Marne department, northeastern France. It was created at the French canton reorganisation which came into effect in March 2015. Its seat is in Sézanne.

It consists of the following communes:

1. Allemant
2. Barbonne-Fayel
3. Bergères-sous-Montmirail
4. Bethon
5. Boissy-le-Repos
6. Bouchy-Saint-Genest
7. Broussy-le-Petit
8. Broyes
9. Champguyon
10. Chantemerle
11. Charleville
12. Châtillon-sur-Morin
13. Chichey
14. Corfélix
15. Corrobert
16. Courgivaux
17. Escardes
18. Les Essarts-le-Vicomte
19. Les Essarts-lès-Sézanne
20. Esternay
21. Fontaine-Denis-Nuisy
22. La Forestière
23. Fromentières
24. Le Gault-Soigny
25. Gaye
26. Janvilliers
27. Joiselle
28. Lachy
29. Linthelles
30. Linthes
31. Mécringes
32. Le Meix-Saint-Epoing
33. Mœurs-Verdey
34. Mondement-Montgivroux
35. Montgenost
36. Montmirail
37. Morsains
38. Nesle-la-Reposte
39. Neuvy
40. La Noue
41. Oyes
42. Péas
43. Queudes
44. Reuves
45. Réveillon
46. Rieux
47. Saint-Bon
48. Saint-Loup
49. Saint-Remy-sous-Broyes
50. Saudoy
51. Sézanne
52. Soizy-aux-Bois
53. Le Thoult-Trosnay
54. Tréfols
55. Vauchamps
56. Verdon
57. Le Vézier
58. Villeneuve-la-Lionne
59. La Villeneuve-lès-Charleville
60. Villeneuve-Saint-Vistre-et-Villevotte
61. Vindey
