= Le Gault-Soigny =

- Commune
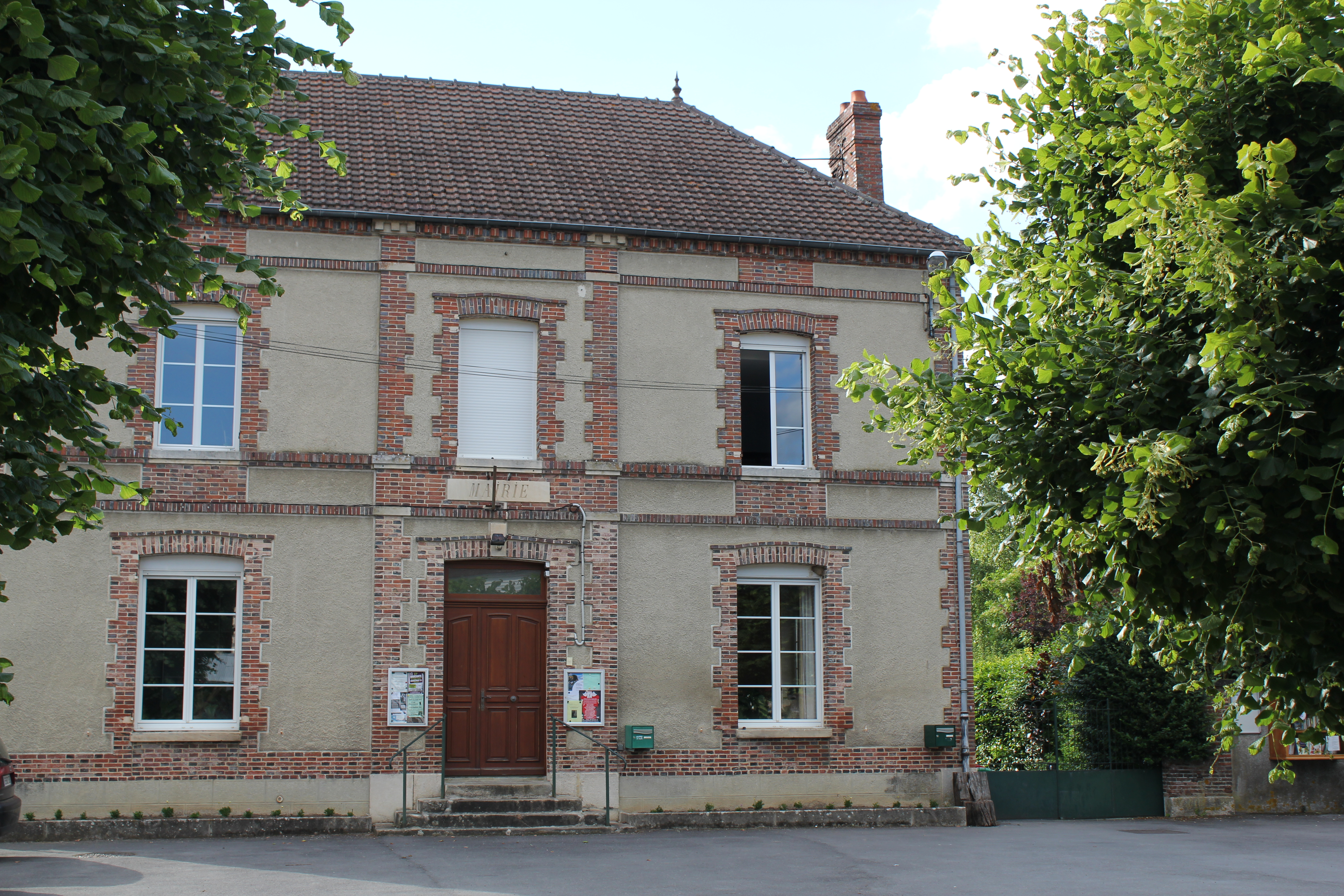
- The town hall in Le Gault-Soigny
- Location of Le Gault-Soigny
- Location within France Location within Grand Est
- Coordinates: 48°48′58″N 3°35′32″E
- Country: France
- Region: Grand Est
- Department: Marne
- Arrondissement: Épernay
- Canton: Sézanne-Brie et Champagne

Government
  - Mayor (2020–2026): André Doussot-Cochet
- Area^{1}: 26.09 km^{2} (10.07 sq mi)
- Elevation: 194 m (636 ft)
- Population (2023): 503
  - Density: 19.3/km^{2} (49.9/sq mi)
- Time zone: UTC+01:00 (CET)
  - Summer (DST): UTC+02:00 (CEST)
- INSEE/Postal code: 51264 /51210
- ^{1} French Land Register data, which excludes lakes, ponds, glaciers > 1 km^{2} (0.386 sq mi or 247 acres) and river estuaries.

Le Gault-Soigny (French pronunciation: [lə ɡo swaɲi]) is a commune in the Marne department in the Grand Est region in north-eastern France.

== See also ==
- Communes of the Marne department
