= Le Thoult-Trosnay =

Thoult-Trosnay
- Commune
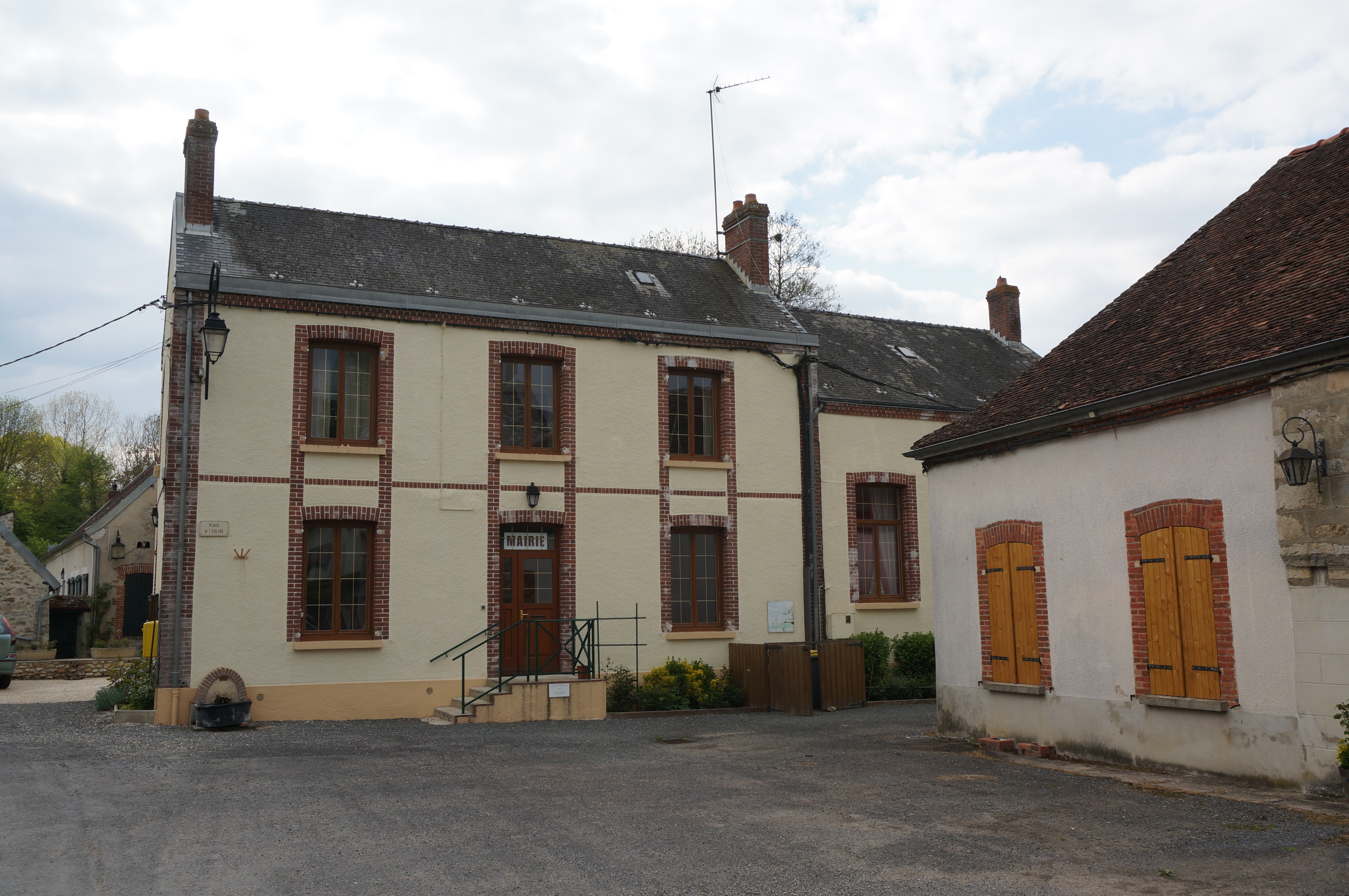
- The town hall in Le Thoult-Trosnay
- Location of Thoult-Trosnay
- Location within France Location within Grand Est
- Coordinates: 48°51′05″N 3°41′23″E
- Country: France
- Region: Grand Est
- Department: Marne
- Arrondissement: Épernay
- Canton: Sézanne-Brie et Champagne
- Intercommunality: CC Brie Champenoise

Government
  - Mayor (2020–2026): François Robin
- Area^{1}: 14.89 km^{2} (5.75 sq mi)
- Elevation: 140 m (460 ft)
- Population (2023): 105
  - Density: 7.05/km^{2} (18.3/sq mi)
- Time zone: UTC+01:00 (CET)
  - Summer (DST): UTC+02:00 (CEST)
- INSEE/Postal code: 51570 /51210
- ^{1} French Land Register data, which excludes lakes, ponds, glaciers > 1 km^{2} (0.386 sq mi or 247 acres) and river estuaries.

Le Thoult-Trosnay is a commune in the Marne department in the Grand Est region in north-eastern France.

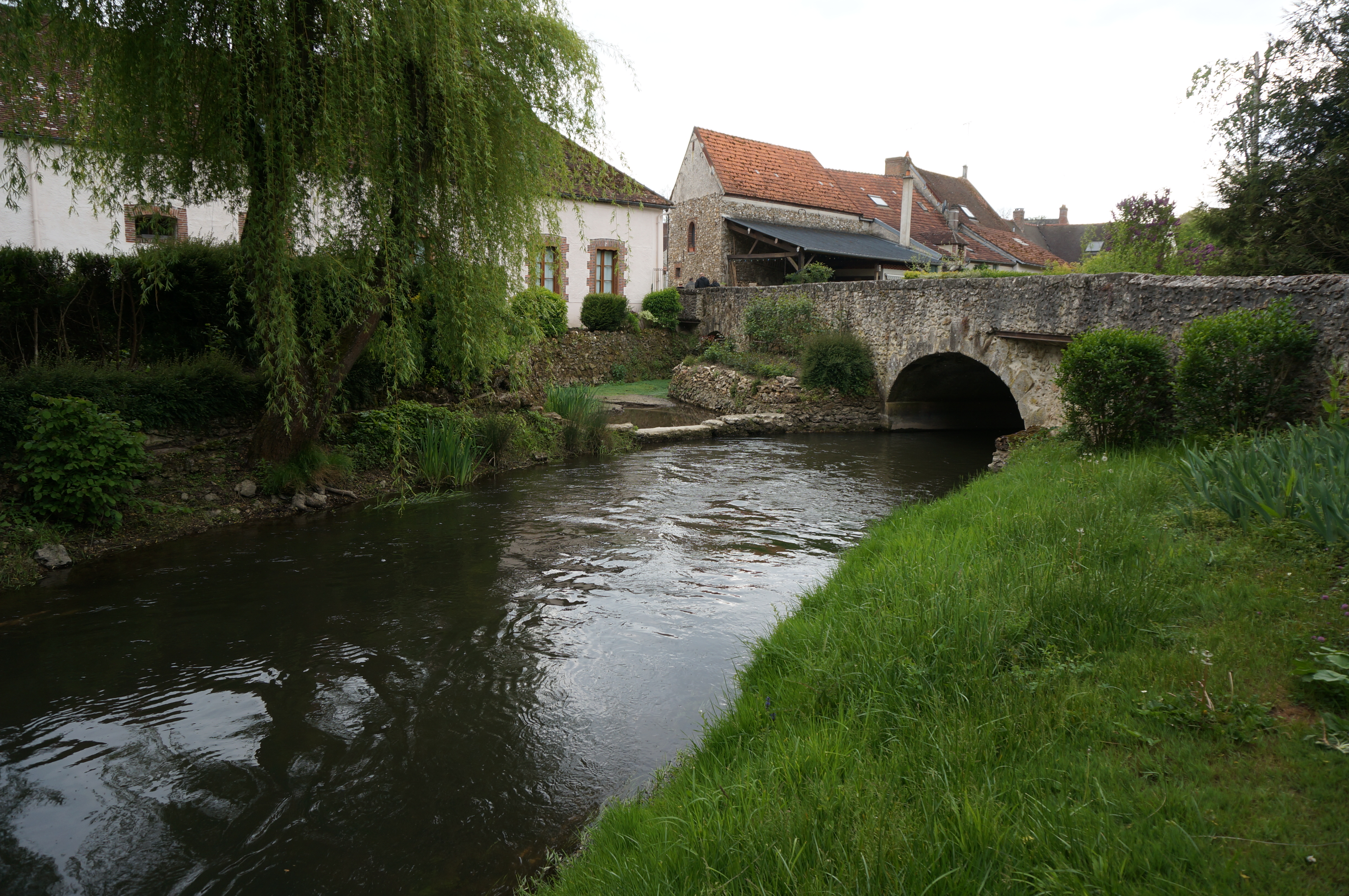
Petit Morin, river

== See also ==
- Communes of the Marne department
