= Courgivaux =

- Commune
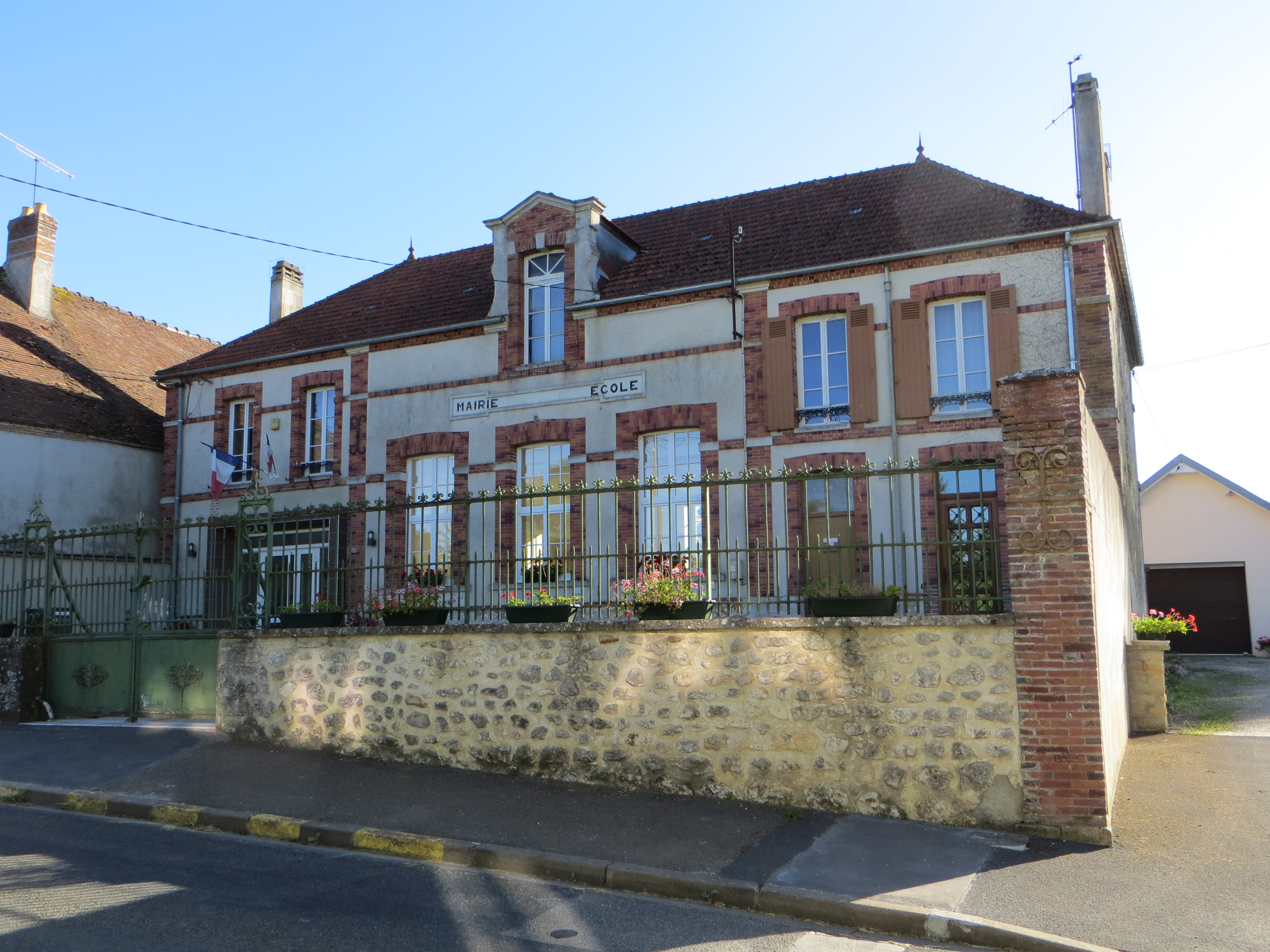
- The town hall in Courgivaux

- Coat of arms
- Location of Courgivaux
- Location within France Location within Grand Est
- Coordinates: 48°42′47″N 3°29′20″E
- Country: France
- Region: Grand Est
- Department: Marne
- Arrondissement: Épernay
- Canton: Sézanne-Brie et Champagne
- Intercommunality: Sézanne-Sud Ouest Marnais

Government
  - Mayor (2020–2026): Sylvie Lefranc
- Area^{1}: 10.72 km^{2} (4.14 sq mi)
- Elevation: 180 m (590 ft)
- Population (2023): 277
  - Density: 25.8/km^{2} (66.9/sq mi)
- Time zone: UTC+01:00 (CET)
  - Summer (DST): UTC+02:00 (CEST)
- INSEE/Postal code: 51185 /51310
- ^{1} French Land Register data, which excludes lakes, ponds, glaciers > 1 km^{2} (0.386 sq mi or 247 acres) and river estuaries.

Courgivaux (French pronunciation: [kuʁʒivo]) is a commune in the Marne department in north-eastern France.

== See also ==
- Communes of the Marne department
