= Mécringes =

- Commune
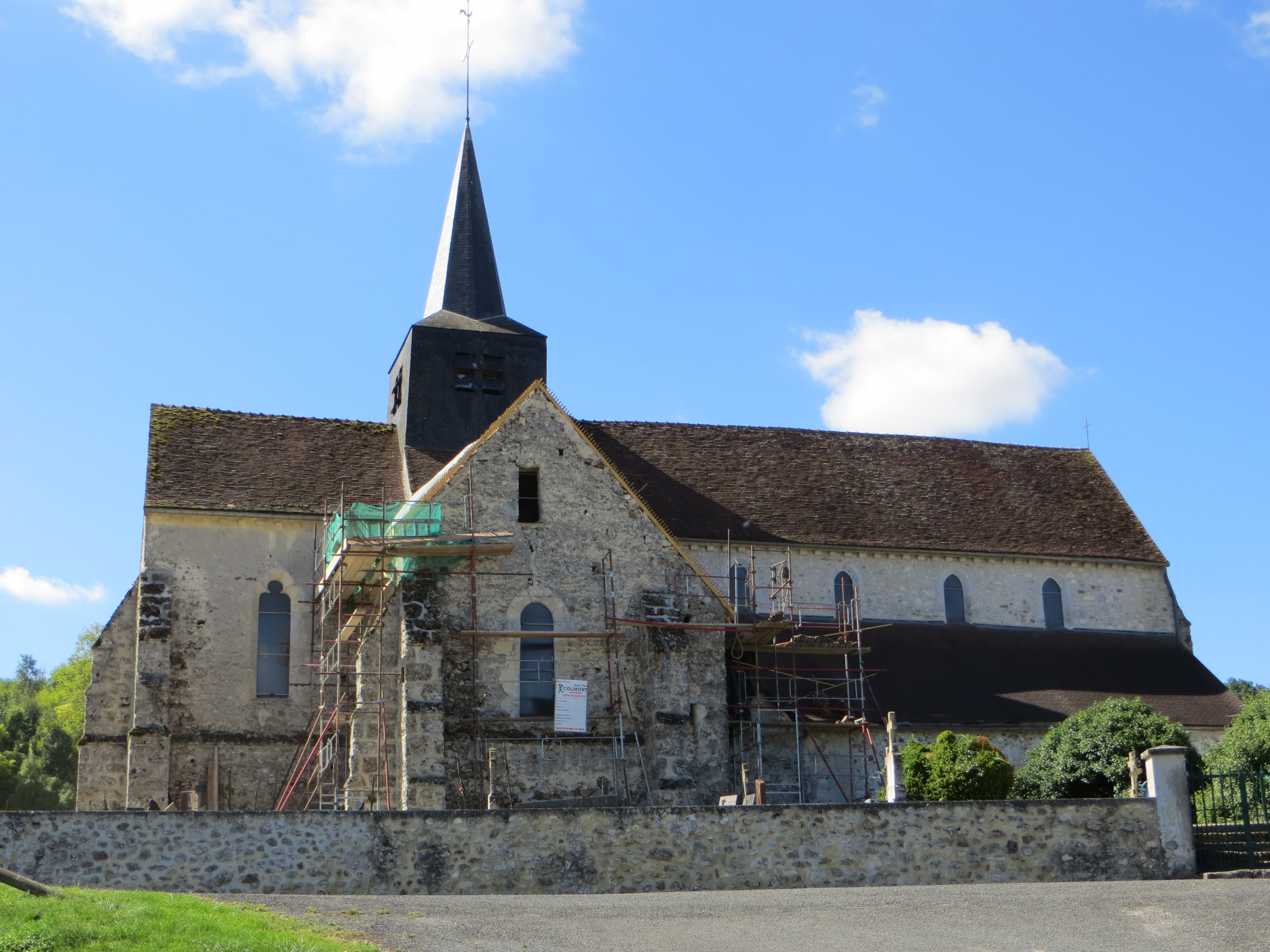
- The church in Mécringes
- Location of Mécringes
- Location within France Location within Grand Est
- Coordinates: 48°52′00″N 3°30′33″E
- Country: France
- Region: Grand Est
- Department: Marne
- Arrondissement: Épernay
- Canton: Sézanne-Brie et Champagne
- Intercommunality: CC Brie Champenoise

Government
  - Mayor (2020–2026): Guillaume Costelet
- Area^{1}: 10.68 km^{2} (4.12 sq mi)
- Elevation: 200 m (660 ft)
- Population (2023): 207
  - Density: 19.4/km^{2} (50.2/sq mi)
- Time zone: UTC+01:00 (CET)
  - Summer (DST): UTC+02:00 (CEST)
- INSEE/Postal code: 51359 /51210
- ^{1} French Land Register data, which excludes lakes, ponds, glaciers > 1 km^{2} (0.386 sq mi or 247 acres) and river estuaries.

Mécringes (French pronunciation: [mekʁɛ̃ʒ]) is a commune in the Marne department in north-eastern France.

== See also ==
- Communes of the Marne department
