= La Villeneuve-lès-Charleville =

- Commune
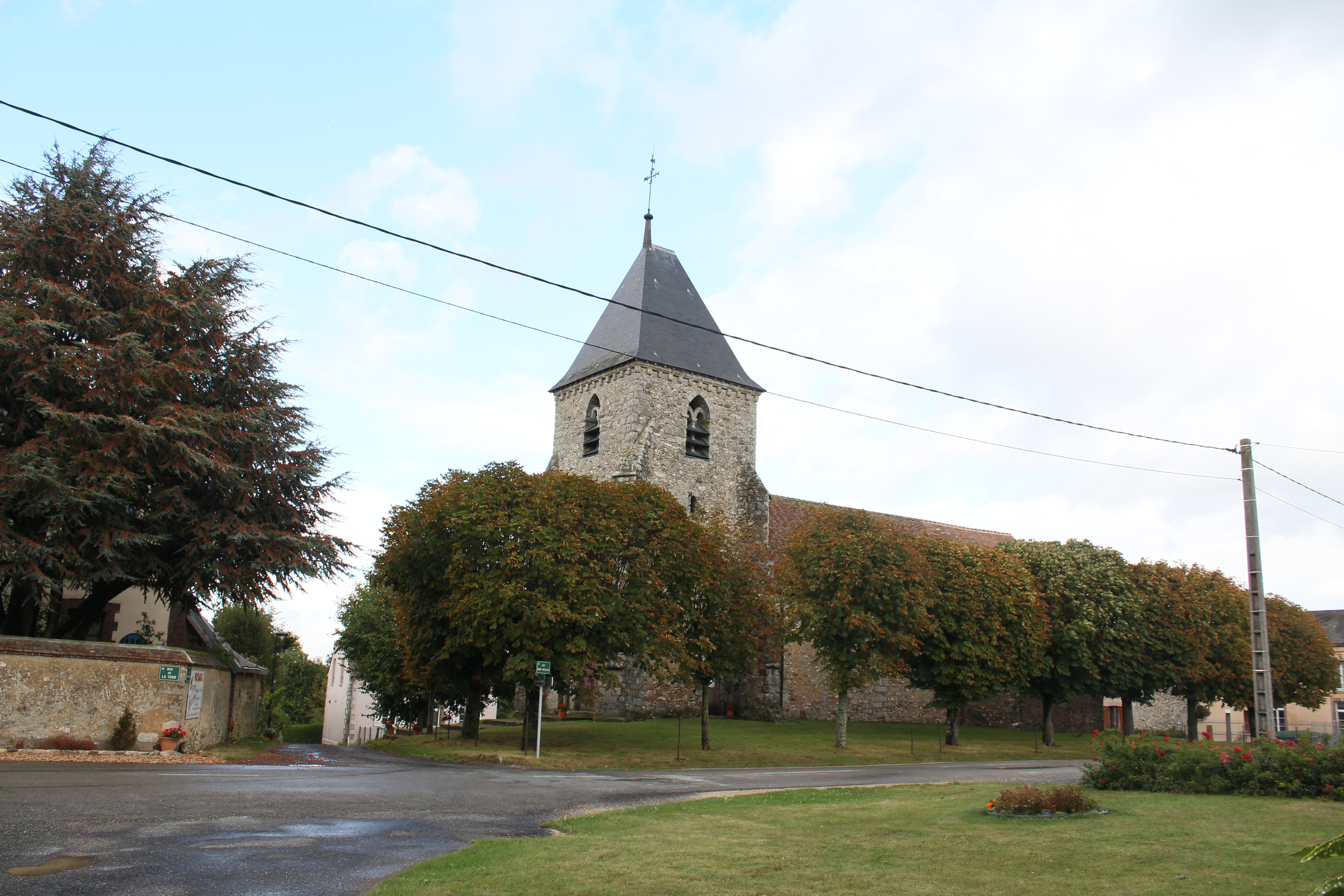
- The church in La Villeneuve-lès-Charleville
- Location of La Villeneuve-lès-Charleville
- Location within France Location within Grand Est
- Coordinates: 48°48′31″N 3°41′44″E
- Country: France
- Region: Grand Est
- Department: Marne
- Arrondissement: Épernay
- Canton: Sézanne-Brie et Champagne
- Intercommunality: CC Brie Champenoise

Government
  - Mayor (2025–2026): Christophe Moncuy
- Area^{1}: 11.17 km^{2} (4.31 sq mi)
- Elevation: 216 m (709 ft)
- Population (2023): 117
  - Density: 10.5/km^{2} (27.1/sq mi)
- Time zone: UTC+01:00 (CET)
  - Summer (DST): UTC+02:00 (CEST)
- INSEE/Postal code: 51626 /51120
- ^{1} French Land Register data, which excludes lakes, ponds, glaciers > 1 km^{2} (0.386 sq mi or 247 acres) and river estuaries.

La Villeneuve-lès-Charleville (French pronunciation: [la vilnœv lɛ ʃaʁləvil], lit. 'La Villeneuve near Charleville') is a commune in the Marne department in north-eastern France.

== See also ==
- Communes of the Marne department
