= Nesle-la-Reposte =

- Commune
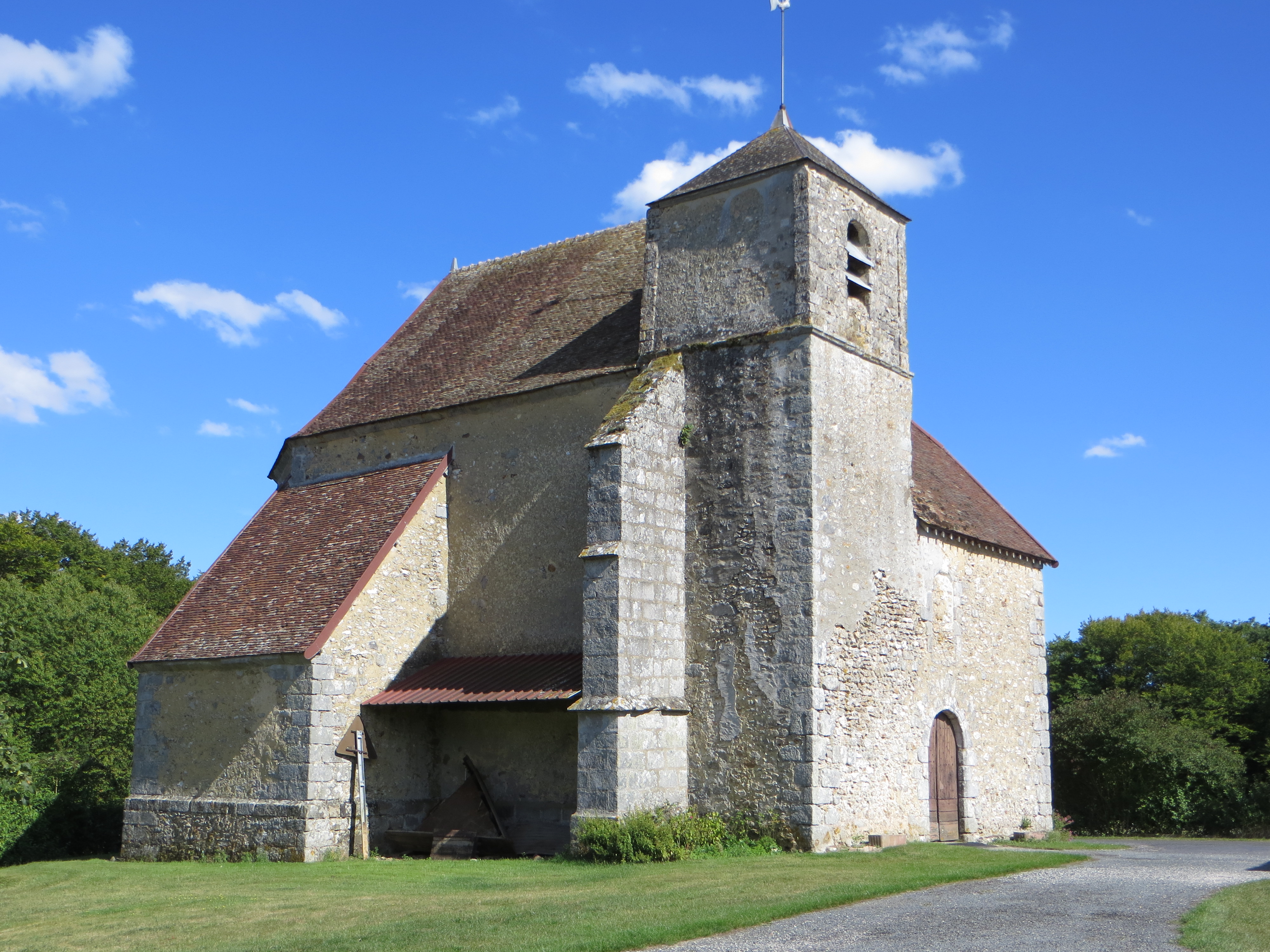
- The church in Nesle-la-Reposte
- Location of Nesle-la-Reposte
- Location within France Location within Grand Est
- Coordinates: 48°37′57″N 3°33′21″E
- Country: France
- Region: Grand Est
- Department: Marne
- Arrondissement: Épernay
- Canton: Sézanne-Brie et Champagne
- Intercommunality: Sézanne-Sud Ouest Marnais

Government
  - Mayor (2020–2026): Yves Charpy
- Area^{1}: 10.64 km^{2} (4.11 sq mi)
- Elevation: 144 m (472 ft)
- Population (2023): 89
  - Density: 8.4/km^{2} (22/sq mi)
- Time zone: UTC+01:00 (CET)
  - Summer (DST): UTC+02:00 (CEST)
- INSEE/Postal code: 51395 /51120
- ^{1} French Land Register data, which excludes lakes, ponds, glaciers > 1 km^{2} (0.386 sq mi or 247 acres) and river estuaries.

Nesle-la-Reposte (French pronunciation: [nɛl la ʁəpɔst]) is a commune in the Marne department in north-eastern France.

== See also ==
- Communes of the Marne department
