= Vindey =

- Commune
- Location of Vindey
- Location within France Location within Grand Est
- Coordinates: 48°41′59″N 3°42′41″E
- Country: France
- Region: Grand Est
- Department: Marne
- Arrondissement: Épernay
- Canton: Sézanne-Brie et Champagne

Government
  - Mayor (2020–2026): Michel Peligri
- Area^{1}: 7.94 km^{2} (3.07 sq mi)
- Elevation: 141 m (463 ft)
- Population (2023): 105
  - Density: 13.2/km^{2} (34.3/sq mi)
- Time zone: UTC+01:00 (CET)
  - Summer (DST): UTC+02:00 (CEST)
- INSEE/Postal code: 51645 /51120
- ^{1} French Land Register data, which excludes lakes, ponds, glaciers > 1 km^{2} (0.386 sq mi or 247 acres) and river estuaries.

Vindey (French pronunciation: [vɛ̃dɛ]) is a commune in the Marne department in north-eastern France.

== See also ==
- Communes of the Marne department
