= Verdon, Marne =

Verdon
- Commune
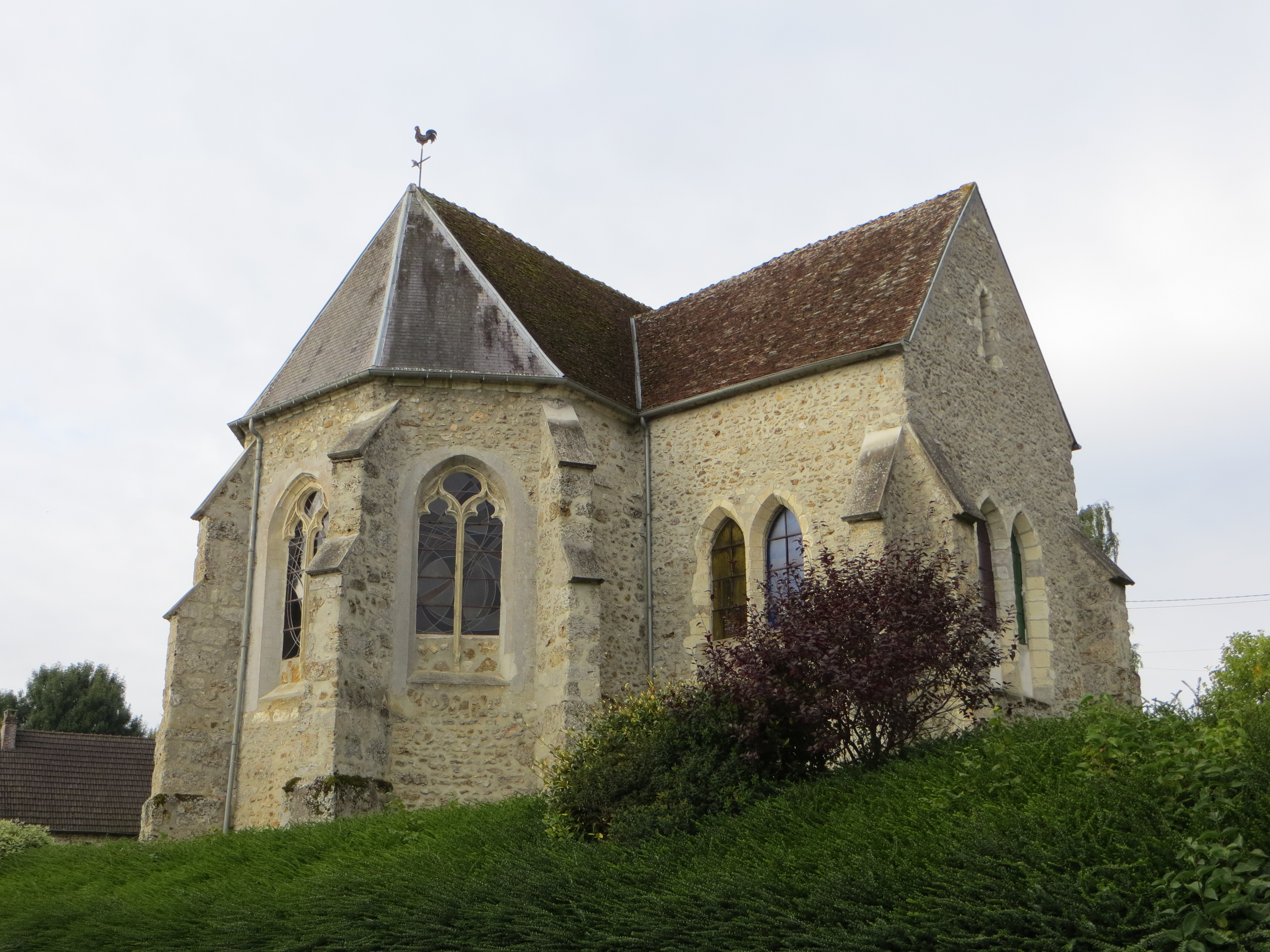
- The church in Verdon
- Location of Verdon
- Location within France Location within Grand Est
- Coordinates: 48°56′59″N 3°37′20″E
- Country: France
- Region: Grand Est
- Department: Marne
- Arrondissement: Épernay
- Canton: Sézanne-Brie et Champagne
- Intercommunality: CC Brie Champenoise

Government
  - Mayor (2020–2026): Stéphane Champagne
- Area^{1}: 11.39 km^{2} (4.40 sq mi)
- Elevation: 168 m (551 ft)
- Population (2023): 195
  - Density: 17.1/km^{2} (44.3/sq mi)
- Time zone: UTC+01:00 (CET)
  - Summer (DST): UTC+02:00 (CEST)
- INSEE/Postal code: 51607 /51210
- ^{1} French Land Register data, which excludes lakes, ponds, glaciers > 1 km^{2} (0.386 sq mi or 247 acres) and river estuaries.

Verdon (French pronunciation: [vɛʁdɔ̃]) is a commune in the Marne department in north-eastern France.

== See also ==
- Communes of the Marne department
