= Montgenost =

- Commune
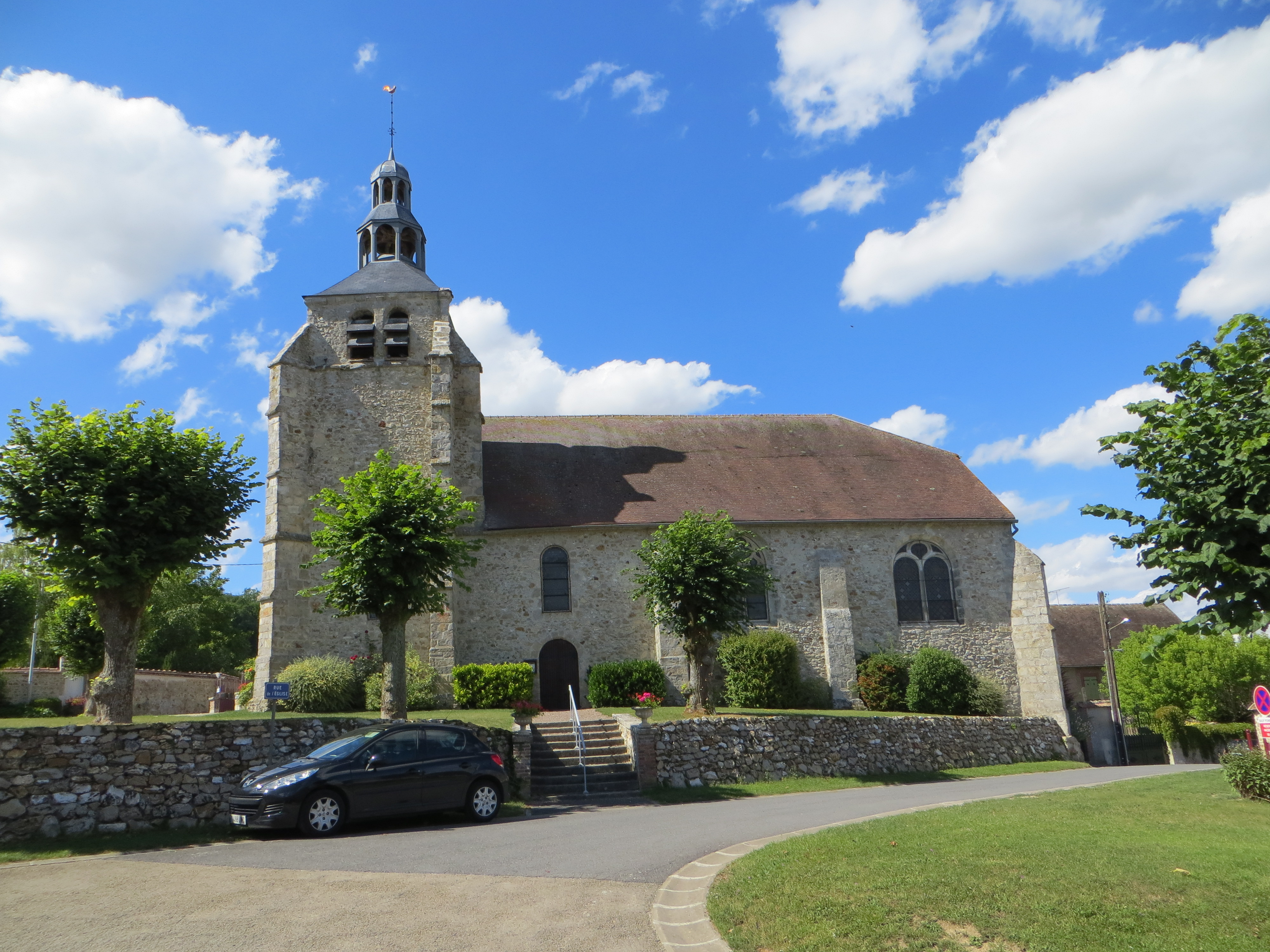
- The church in Montgenost
- Location of Montgenost
- Location within France Location within Grand Est
- Coordinates: 48°35′52″N 3°35′44″E
- Country: France
- Region: Grand Est
- Department: Marne
- Arrondissement: Épernay
- Canton: Sézanne-Brie et Champagne
- Intercommunality: Sézanne-Sud Ouest Marnais

Government
  - Mayor (2020–2026): Bruno Sans
- Area^{1}: 8.4 km^{2} (3.2 sq mi)
- Elevation: 195 m (640 ft)
- Population (2023): 161
  - Density: 19/km^{2} (50/sq mi)
- Time zone: UTC+01:00 (CET)
  - Summer (DST): UTC+02:00 (CEST)
- INSEE/Postal code: 51376 /51260
- ^{1} French Land Register data, which excludes lakes, ponds, glaciers > 1 km^{2} (0.386 sq mi or 247 acres) and river estuaries.

Montgenost (French pronunciation: [mɔ̃ʒəno]) is a commune in the Marne department in north-eastern France.

== See also ==
- Communes of the Marne department
