= Barbonne-Fayel =

- Commune
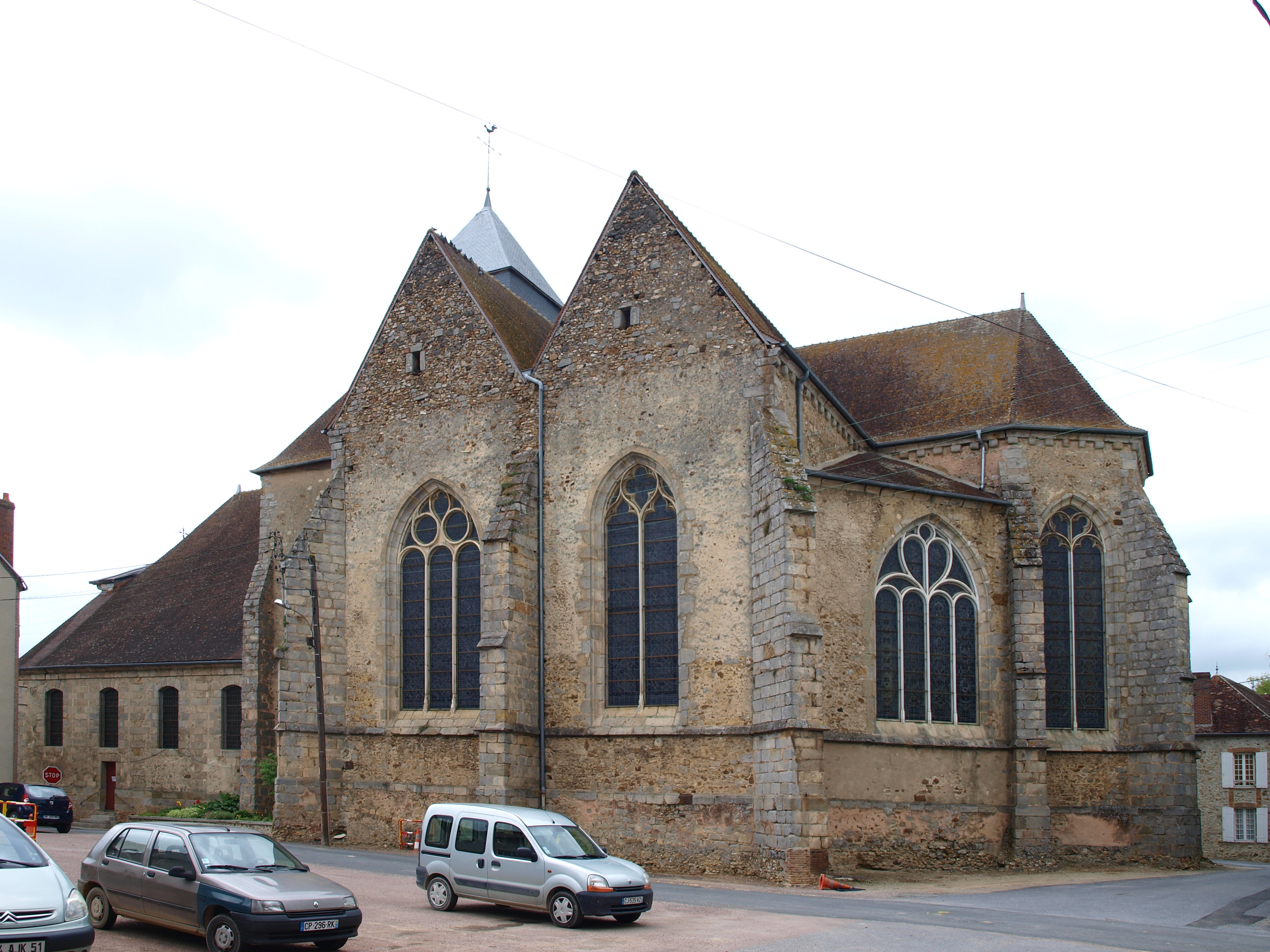
- The church in Barbonne-Fayel
- Location of Barbonne-Fayel
- Location within France Location within Grand Est
- Coordinates: 48°39′28″N 3°41′49″E
- Country: France
- Region: Grand Est
- Department: Marne
- Arrondissement: Épernay
- Canton: Sézanne-Brie et Champagne

Government
  - Mayor (2020–2026): Jean-Louis Benoist
- Area^{1}: 24.35 km^{2} (9.40 sq mi)
- Elevation: 115 m (377 ft)
- Population (2023): 482
  - Density: 19.8/km^{2} (51.3/sq mi)
- Time zone: UTC+01:00 (CET)
  - Summer (DST): UTC+02:00 (CEST)
- INSEE/Postal code: 51036 /51120
- ^{1} French Land Register data, which excludes lakes, ponds, glaciers > 1 km^{2} (0.386 sq mi or 247 acres) and river estuaries.

Barbonne-Fayel (French pronunciation: [baʁbɔn fajɛl]) is a commune in the Marne department in northeastern France.

== Population ==
Historical population
Year	Pop.	±% p.a.
1968	627	—
1975	535	−2.24%
1982	502	−0.91%
1990	532	+0.73%
1999	493	−0.84%
2007	492	−0.03%
2012	494	+0.08%
2017	502	+0.32%
2023	482	−0.68%
Source: INSEE

== See also ==
- Communes of the Marne department
