= Linthes =

- Commune
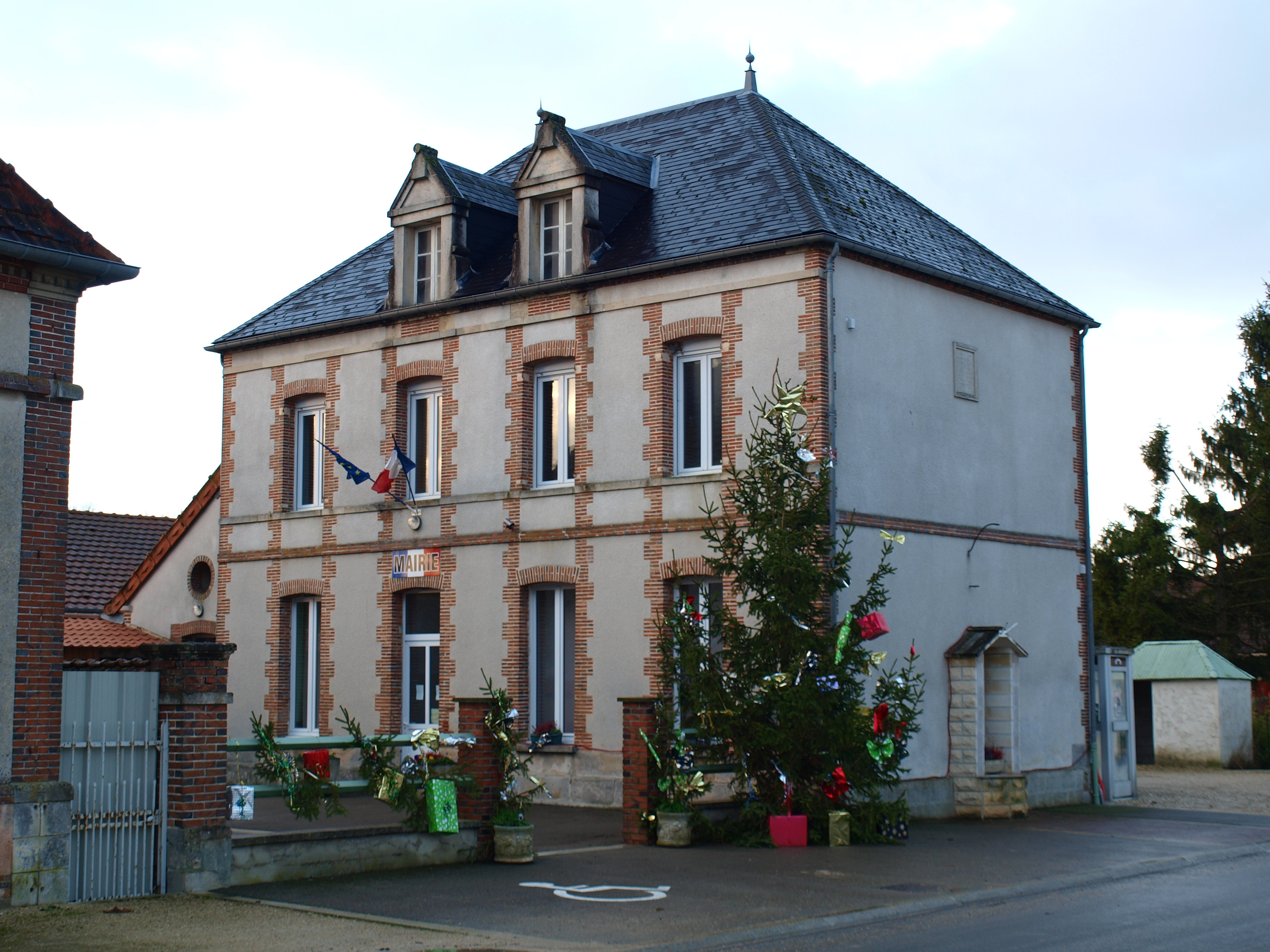
- The town hall in Linthes

- Coat of arms
- Location of Linthes
- Location within France Location within Grand Est
- Coordinates: 48°43′51″N 3°50′53″E
- Country: France
- Region: Grand Est
- Department: Marne
- Arrondissement: Épernay
- Canton: Sézanne-Brie et Champagne

Government
  - Mayor (2020–2026): Serge Varlet
- Area^{1}: 9.03 km^{2} (3.49 sq mi)
- Elevation: 108 m (354 ft)
- Population (2023): 113
  - Density: 12.5/km^{2} (32.4/sq mi)
- Time zone: UTC+01:00 (CET)
  - Summer (DST): UTC+02:00 (CEST)
- INSEE/Postal code: 51324 /51230
- ^{1} French Land Register data, which excludes lakes, ponds, glaciers > 1 km^{2} (0.386 sq mi or 247 acres) and river estuaries.

Linthes (French pronunciation: [lɛ̃t]) is a commune in the Marne department in north-eastern France.

== See also ==
- Communes of the Marne department
