= Le Vézier =

Vézier
- Commune
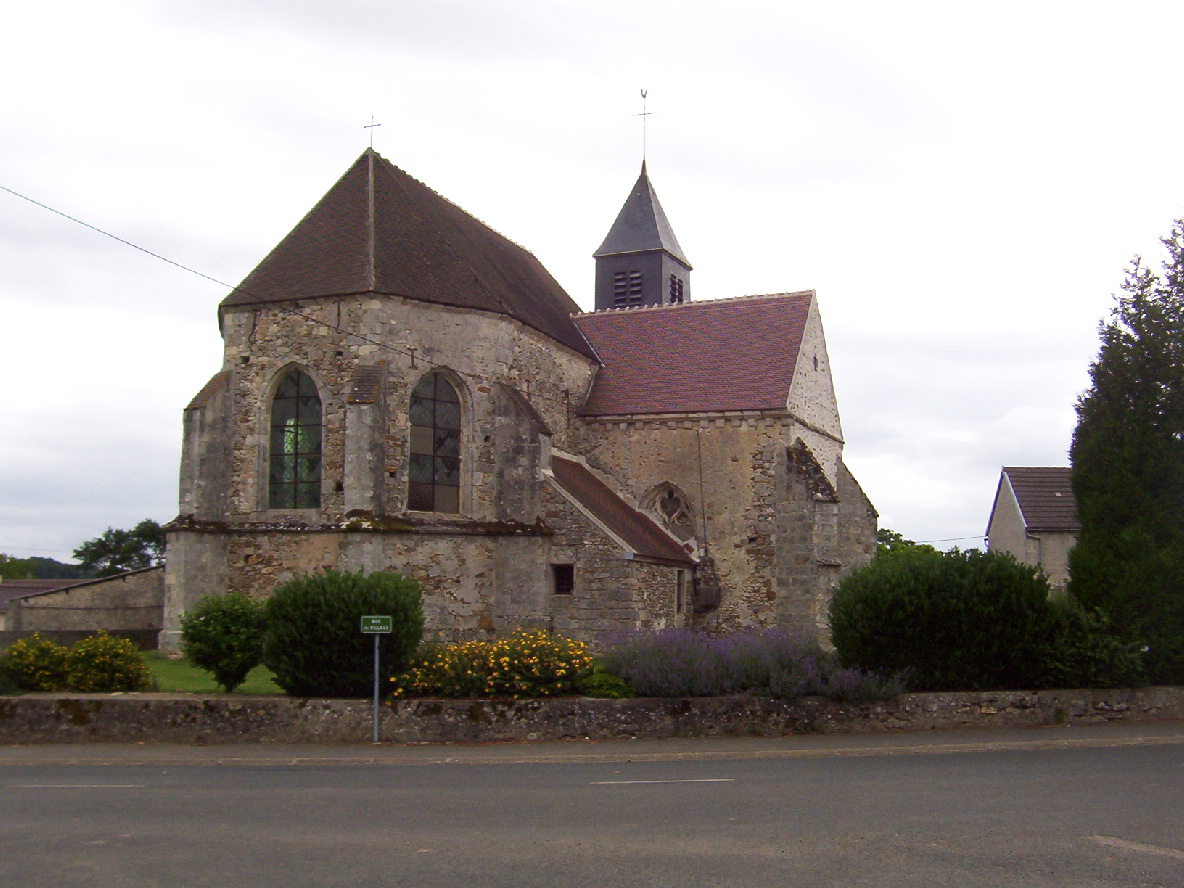
- The church in Le Vézier
- Location of Vézier
- Location within France Location within Grand Est
- Coordinates: 48°47′47″N 3°27′38″E
- Country: France
- Region: Grand Est
- Department: Marne
- Arrondissement: Épernay
- Canton: Sézanne-Brie et Champagne
- Intercommunality: CC Brie Champenoise

Government
  - Mayor (2020–2026): Jean-Marie Cousin
- Area^{1}: 12.39 km^{2} (4.78 sq mi)
- Elevation: 150 m (490 ft)
- Population (2023): 181
  - Density: 14.6/km^{2} (37.8/sq mi)
- Time zone: UTC+01:00 (CET)
  - Summer (DST): UTC+02:00 (CEST)
- INSEE/Postal code: 51618 /51210
- ^{1} French Land Register data, which excludes lakes, ponds, glaciers > 1 km^{2} (0.386 sq mi or 247 acres) and river estuaries.

Le Vézier (French pronunciation: [lə vezje]) is a commune in the Marne department in north-eastern France.

== See also ==
- Communes of the Marne department
Le Vézier

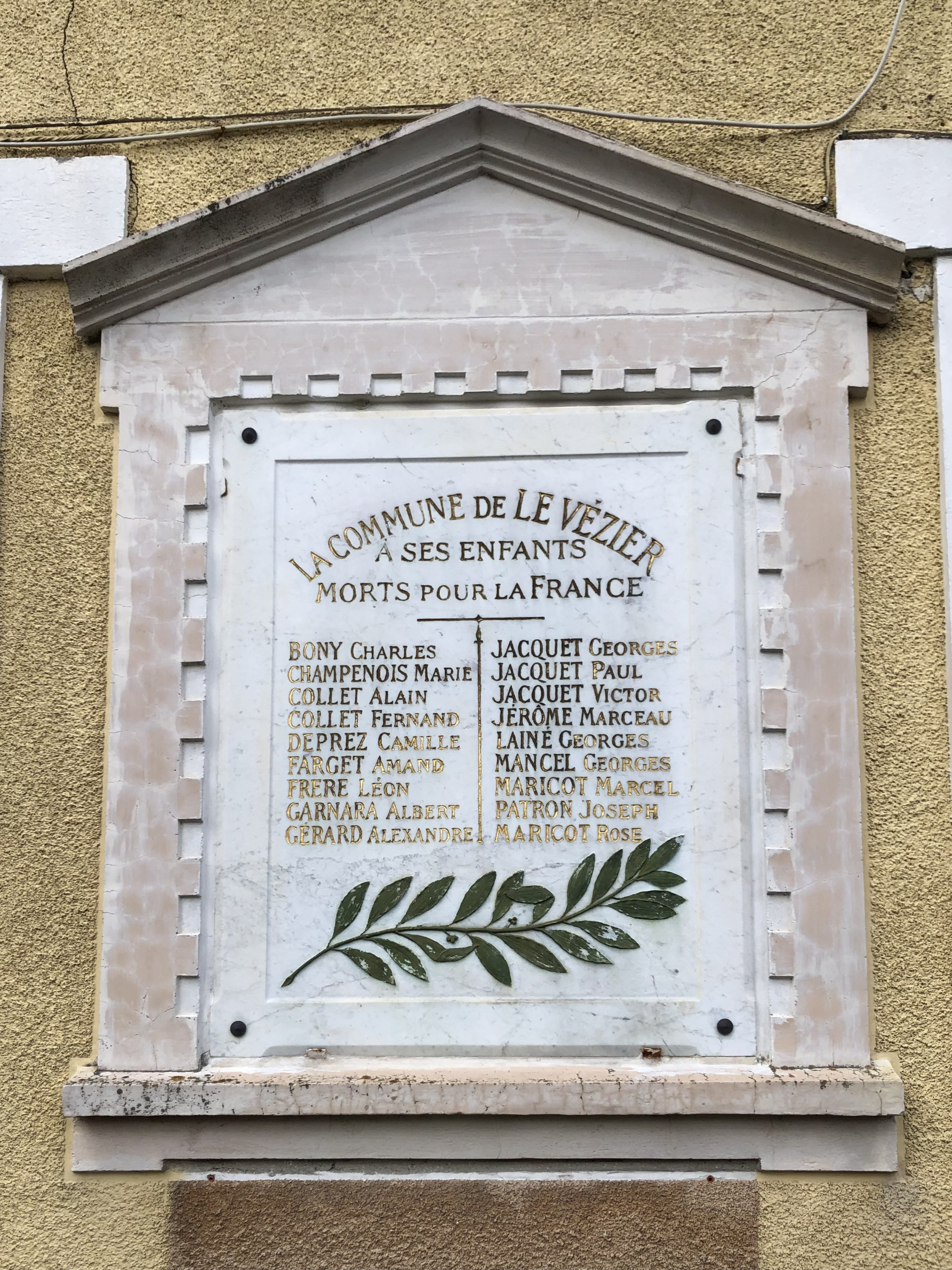

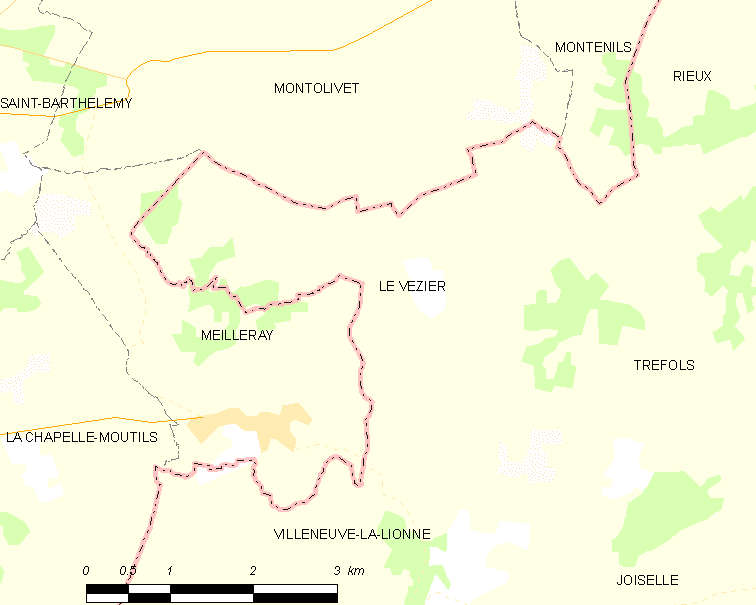
