= Châtillon-sur-Morin =

- Commune
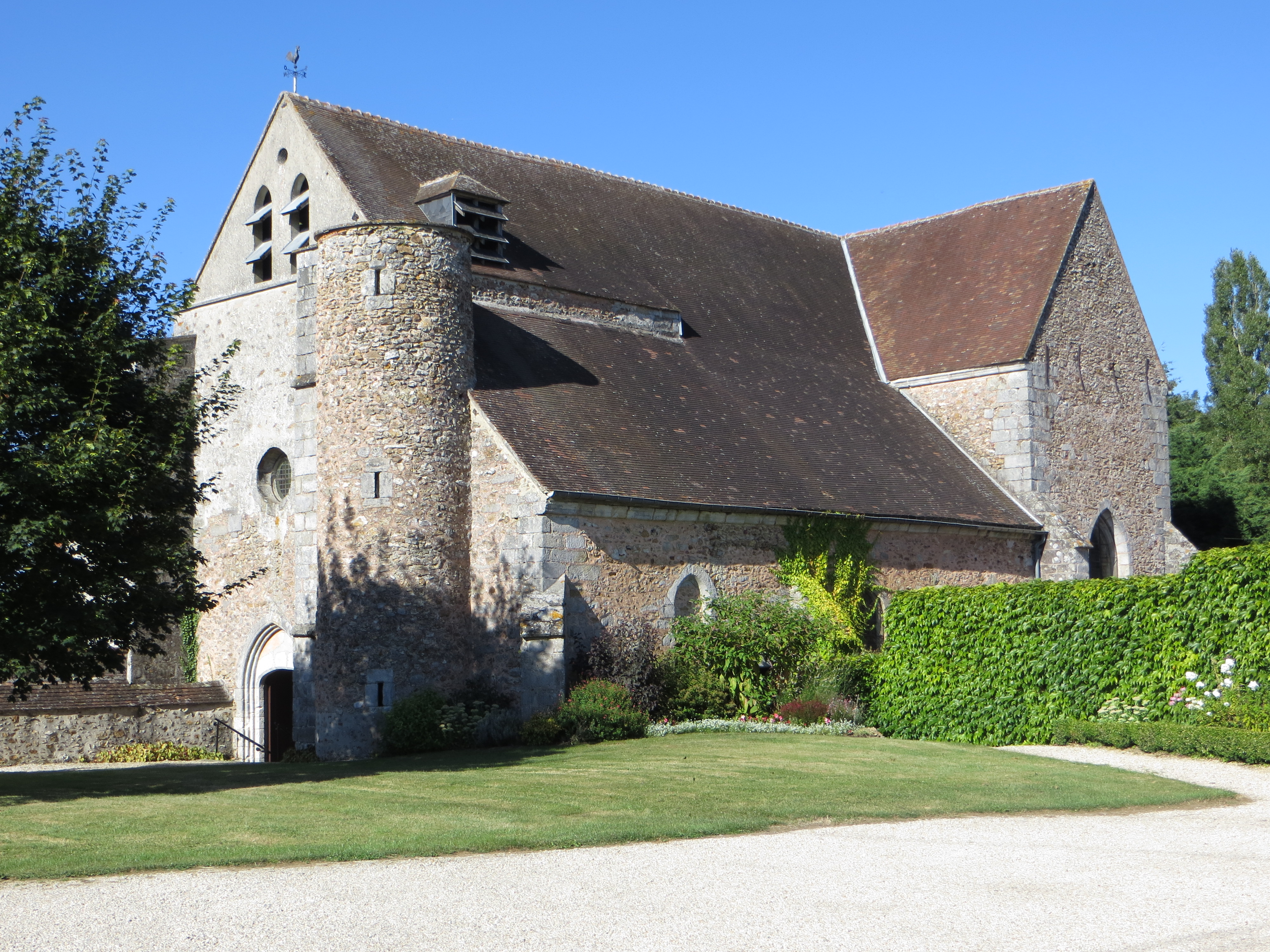
- The church in Châtillon-sur-Morin

- Coat of arms
- Location of Châtillon-sur-Morin
- Location within France Location within Grand Est
- Coordinates: 48°42′51″N 3°34′48″E
- Country: France
- Region: Grand Est
- Department: Marne
- Arrondissement: Épernay
- Canton: Sézanne-Brie et Champagne
- Intercommunality: Sézanne-Sud Ouest Marnais

Government
  - Mayor (2020–2026): Alain Sohier
- Area^{1}: 18.05 km^{2} (6.97 sq mi)
- Elevation: 155 m (509 ft)
- Population (2023): 210
  - Density: 12/km^{2} (30/sq mi)
- Time zone: UTC+01:00 (CET)
  - Summer (DST): UTC+02:00 (CEST)
- INSEE/Postal code: 51137 /51310
- ^{1} French Land Register data, which excludes lakes, ponds, glaciers > 1 km^{2} (0.386 sq mi or 247 acres) and river estuaries.

Châtillon-sur-Morin (French pronunciation: [ʃatijɔ̃ syʁ mɔʁɛ̃], literally Châtillon on Morin) is a commune in the Marne department in north-eastern France.

== See also ==
- Communes of the Marne department
