= Soizy-aux-Bois =

- Commune
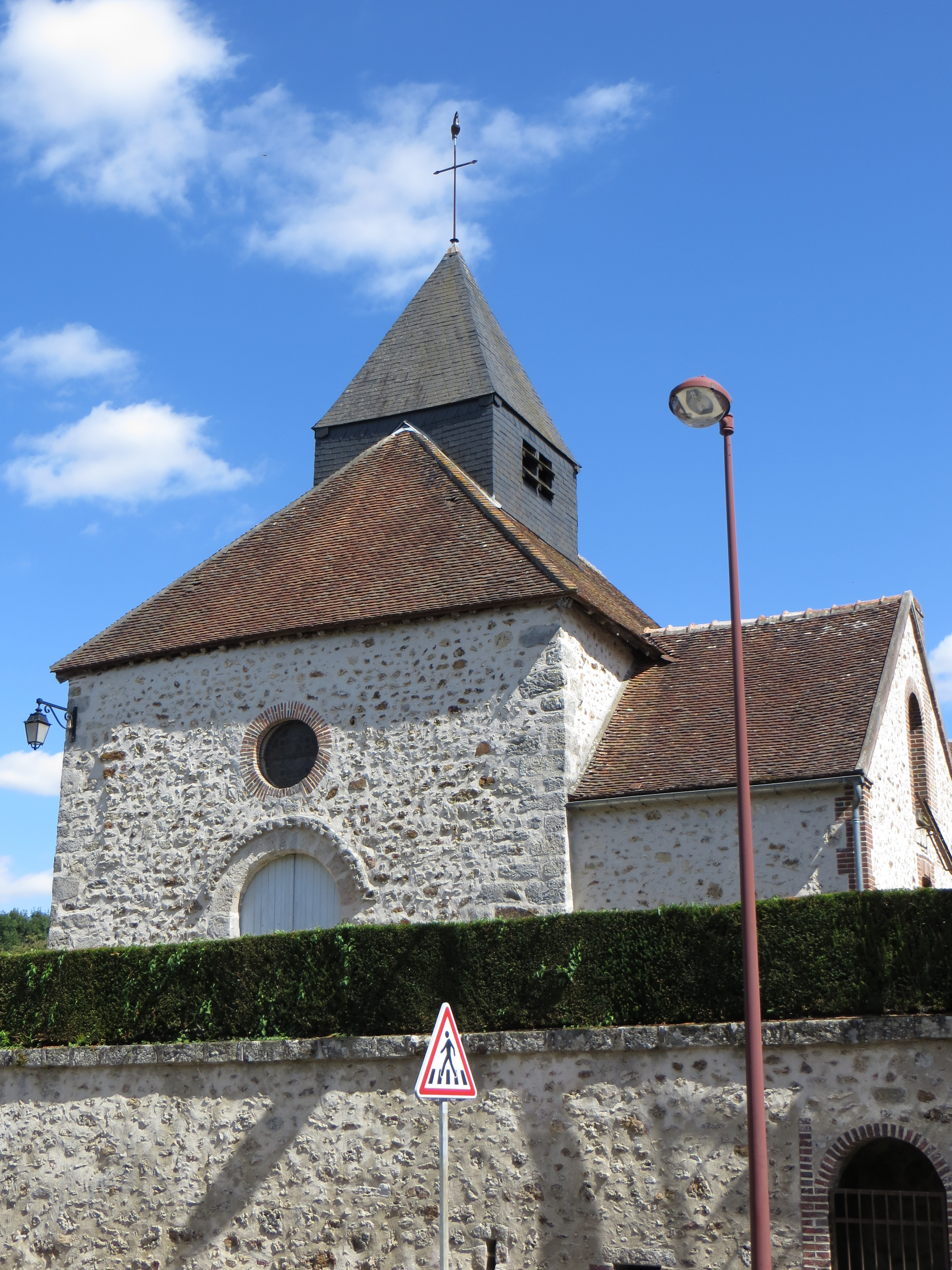
- The church in Soizy-aux-Bois
- Location of Soizy-aux-Bois
- Location within France Location within Grand Est
- Coordinates: 48°48′39″N 3°43′54″E
- Country: France
- Region: Grand Est
- Department: Marne
- Arrondissement: Épernay
- Canton: Sézanne-Brie et Champagne
- Intercommunality: CC Brie Champenoise

Government
  - Mayor (2021–2026): Sandrine Clomes
- Area^{1}: 7.28 km^{2} (2.81 sq mi)
- Elevation: 185 m (607 ft)
- Population (2023): 192
  - Density: 26.4/km^{2} (68.3/sq mi)
- Time zone: UTC+01:00 (CET)
  - Summer (DST): UTC+02:00 (CEST)
- INSEE/Postal code: 51542 /51120
- ^{1} French Land Register data, which excludes lakes, ponds, glaciers > 1 km^{2} (0.386 sq mi or 247 acres) and river estuaries.

Soizy-aux-Bois (French pronunciation: [swazi o bwa]) is a commune in the Marne department in north-eastern France.

== See also ==
- Communes of the Marne department
