= Le Meix-Saint-Epoing =

Meix-Saint-Epoing
- Commune
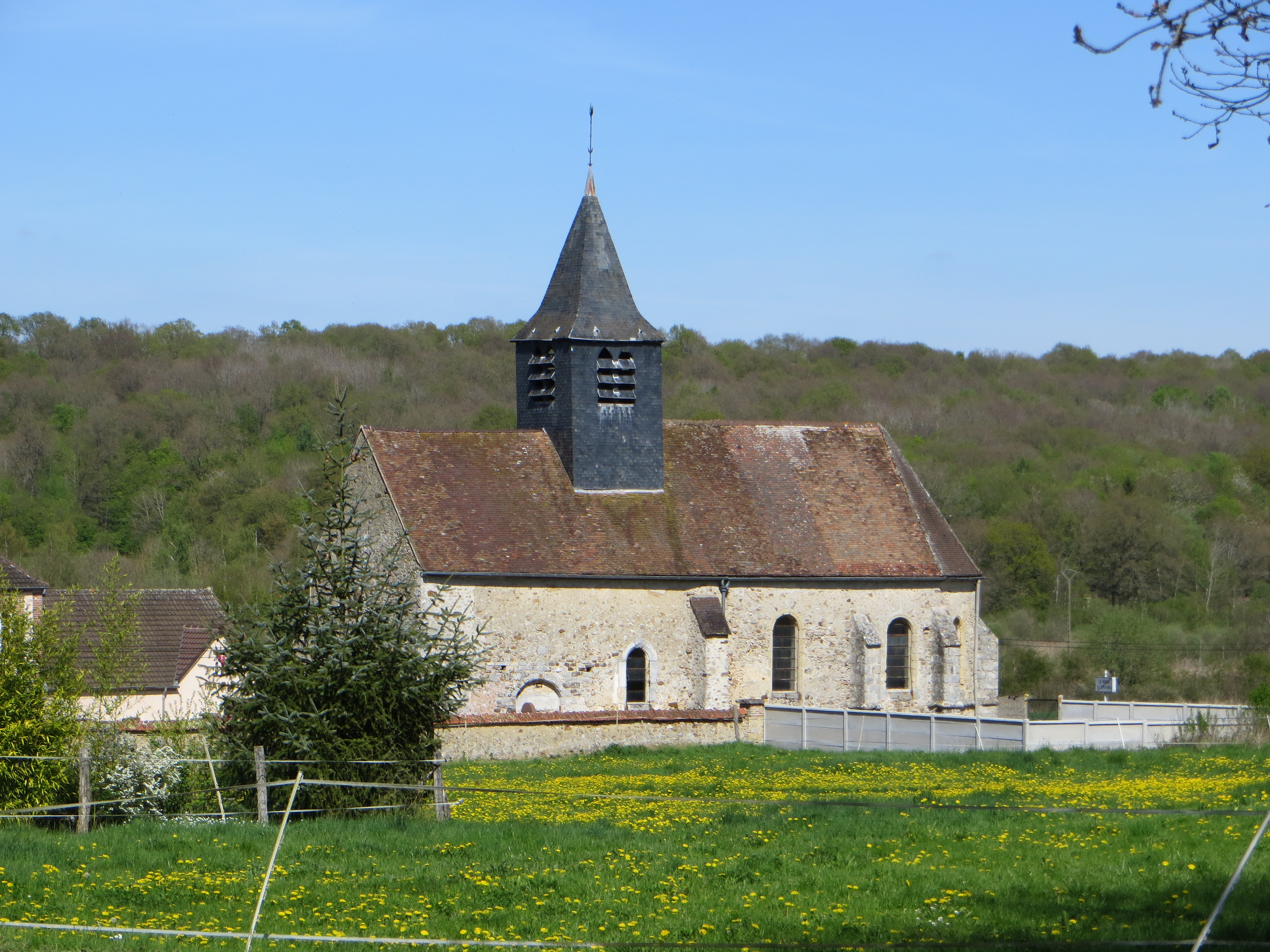
- The church in Le Meix-Saint-Epoing
- Location of Meix-Saint-Epoing
- Location within France Location within Grand Est
- Coordinates: 48°42′18″N 3°38′59″E
- Country: France
- Region: Grand Est
- Department: Marne
- Arrondissement: Épernay
- Canton: Sézanne-Brie et Champagne

Government
  - Mayor (2020–2026): Valérie Lecomte-Bachelier
- Area^{1}: 11.29 km^{2} (4.36 sq mi)
- Elevation: 160 m (520 ft)
- Population (2023): 286
  - Density: 25.3/km^{2} (65.6/sq mi)
- Time zone: UTC+01:00 (CET)
  - Summer (DST): UTC+02:00 (CEST)
- INSEE/Postal code: 51360 /51120
- ^{1} French Land Register data, which excludes lakes, ponds, glaciers > 1 km^{2} (0.386 sq mi or 247 acres) and river estuaries.

Le Meix-Saint-Epoing is a commune in the Marne département in the Grand Est region of north-eastern France.

Inhabitants of Le Meix-Saint-Epoing are called Mexipontains (male) or Mexipontaines (female).

== See also ==
- Communes of the Marne department
