= Escardes =

- Commune
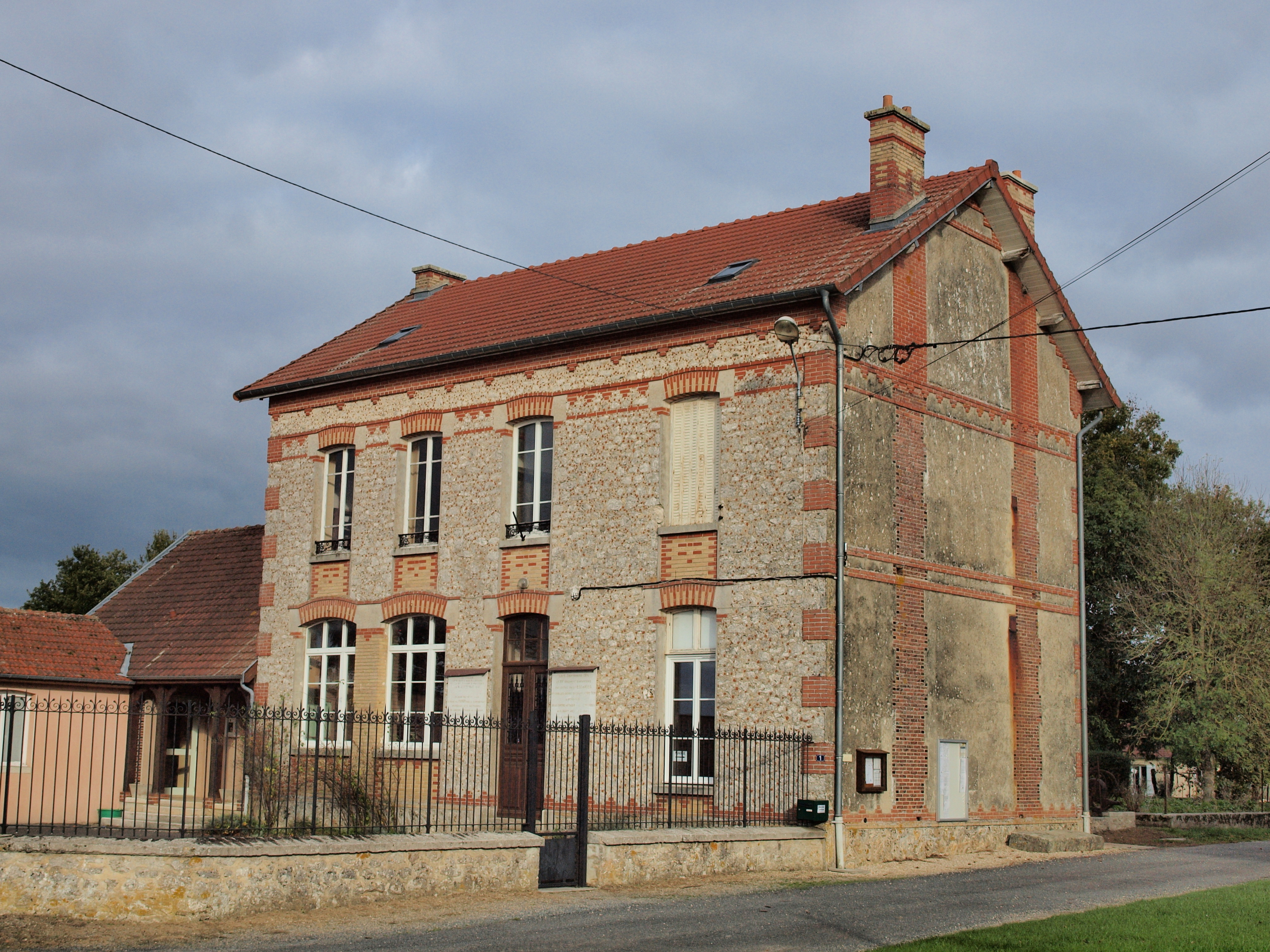
- The town hall in Escardes
- Location of Escardes
- Location within France Location within Grand Est
- Coordinates: 48°41′51″N 3°30′50″E
- Country: France
- Region: Grand Est
- Department: Marne
- Arrondissement: Épernay
- Canton: Sézanne-Brie et Champagne

Government
  - Mayor (2020–2026): François Curfs
- Area^{1}: 14.49 km^{2} (5.59 sq mi)
- Elevation: 191 m (627 ft)
- Population (2023): 61
  - Density: 4.2/km^{2} (11/sq mi)
- Time zone: UTC+01:00 (CET)
  - Summer (DST): UTC+02:00 (CEST)
- INSEE/Postal code: 51233 /51310
- ^{1} French Land Register data, which excludes lakes, ponds, glaciers > 1 km^{2} (0.386 sq mi or 247 acres) and river estuaries.

Escardes (French pronunciation: [ɛskaʁd]) is a commune in the Marne department in north-eastern France.

The inhabitants of Escardes are called Escardiens and their number was 70 in 2018. The town's area is 14.5 km².

== See also ==
- Communes of the Marne department
