= Queudes =

- Commune
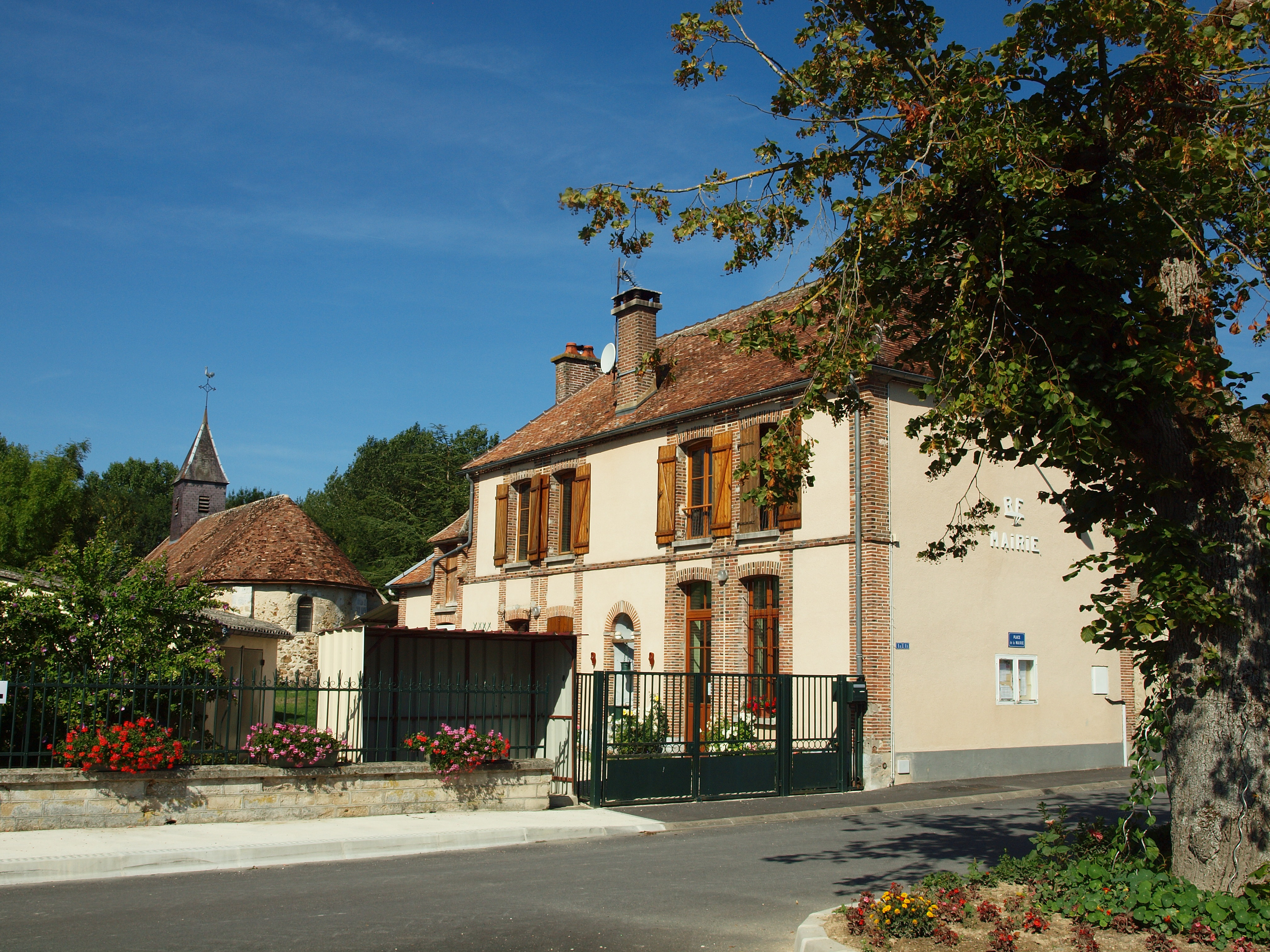
- The town hall in Queudes
- Location of Queudes
- Location within France Location within Grand Est
- Coordinates: 48°39′28″N 3°45′38″E
- Country: France
- Region: Grand Est
- Department: Marne
- Arrondissement: Épernay
- Canton: Sézanne-Brie et Champagne

Government
  - Mayor (2020–2026): Sylvia Jacquesson
- Area^{1}: 10.06 km^{2} (3.88 sq mi)
- Elevation: 90 m (300 ft)
- Population (2023): 79
  - Density: 7.9/km^{2} (20/sq mi)
- Time zone: UTC+01:00 (CET)
  - Summer (DST): UTC+02:00 (CEST)
- INSEE/Postal code: 51451 /51120
- ^{1} French Land Register data, which excludes lakes, ponds, glaciers > 1 km^{2} (0.386 sq mi or 247 acres) and river estuaries.

Queudes (French pronunciation: [kød]) is a commune in the Marne department in north-eastern France.

== See also ==
- Communes of the Marne department
