= Givry-lès-Loisy =

- Commune
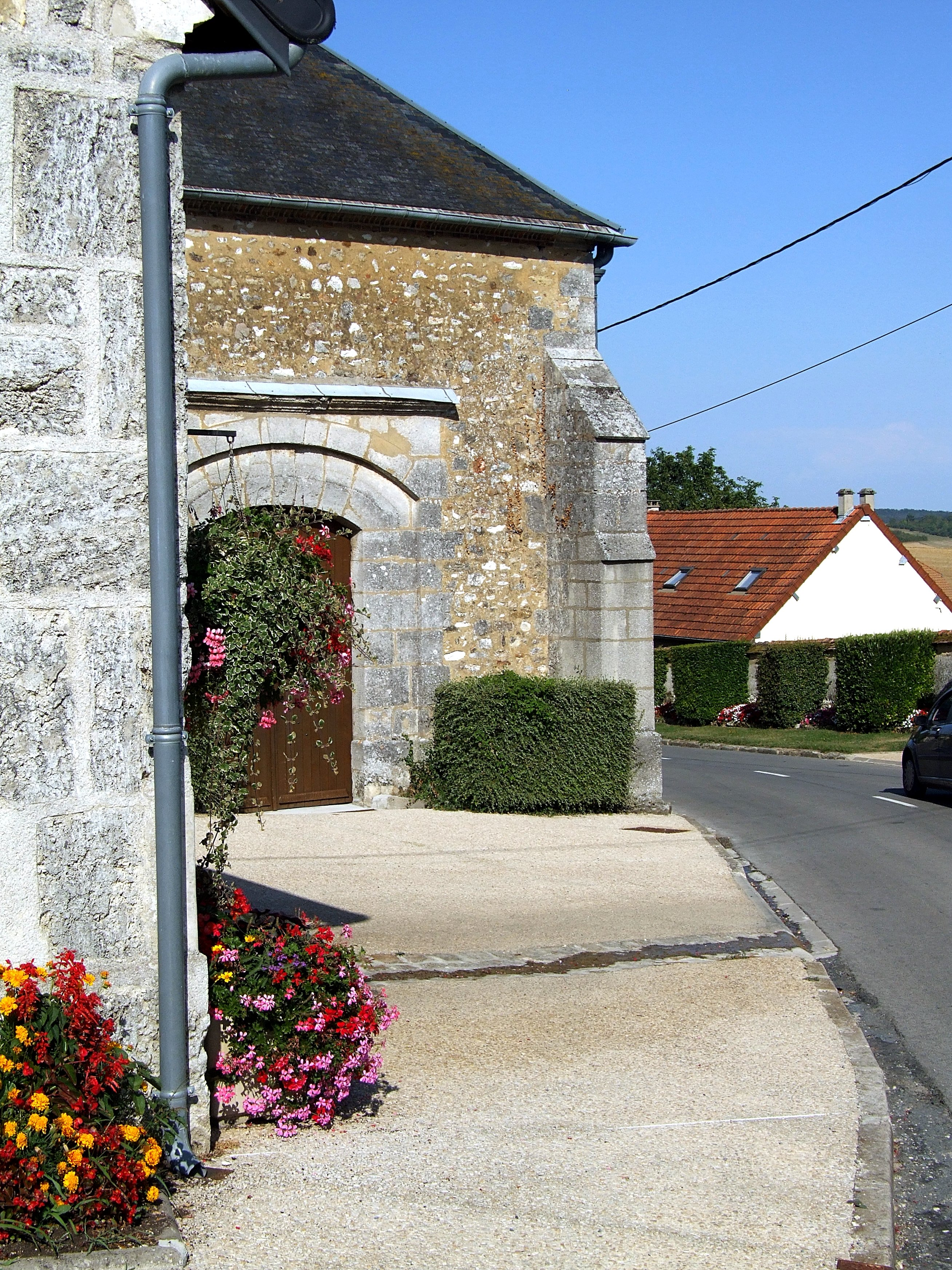
- The church in Givry-lès-Loisy
- Location of Givry-lès-Loisy
- Location within France Location within Grand Est
- Coordinates: 48°53′34″N 3°54′41″E
- Country: France
- Region: Grand Est
- Department: Marne
- Arrondissement: Épernay
- Canton: Vertus-Plaine Champenoise
- Intercommunality: CA Épernay, Coteaux et Plaine de Champagne

Government
  - Mayor (2020–2026): Caroline Fremy
- Area^{1}: 5.05 km^{2} (1.95 sq mi)
- Elevation: 190 m (620 ft)
- Population (2023): 72
  - Density: 14/km^{2} (37/sq mi)
- Time zone: UTC+01:00 (CET)
  - Summer (DST): UTC+02:00 (CEST)
- INSEE/Postal code: 51273 /51130
- ^{1} French Land Register data, which excludes lakes, ponds, glaciers > 1 km^{2} (0.386 sq mi or 247 acres) and river estuaries.

Givry-lès-Loisy (French pronunciation: [ʒivʁi lɛ lwazi], lit. 'Givry near Loisy') is a commune in the Marne department in north-eastern France.

== See also ==
- Communes of the Marne department
