= Marie-Thérèse Morlet =

French linguist (1913–2005)

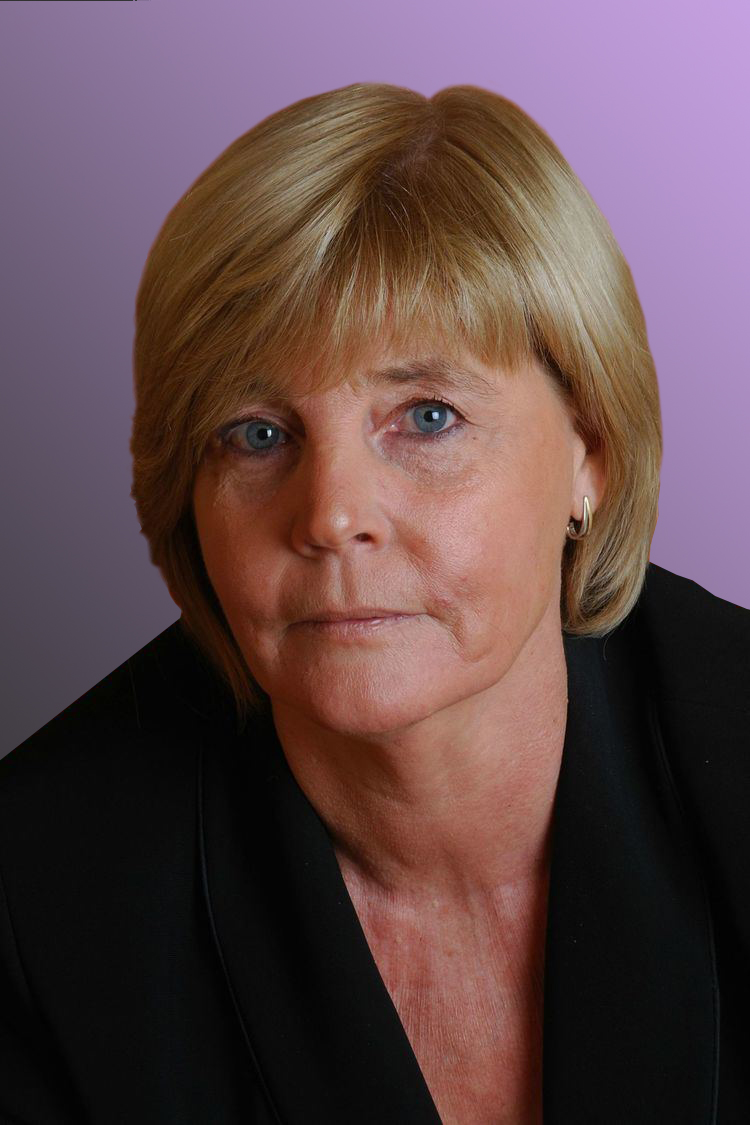
Marie-Thérèse Morlet

Marie-Thérèse Morlet (Guise, Aisne, November 18, 1913 - July 9, 2005) was a French scholar (specialist in onomastics) and honorary director of research at CNRS.

Her publications include Dictionnaire étymologique des noms de famille (Etymological Dictionary of Family Names).

== Les noms de personne sur le territoire de l'ancienne Gaule du VIe au XIIe siècle ==
Her book Les noms de personne sur le territoire de l'ancienne Gaule du VIe au XIIe siècle (Personal Names in the Territory of the former Gaul from the 4th to the 13th Century, abbreviated NPAG) is an anthroponymical dictionary covering the evolution of names in France up to the Middle Ages.

The work is published by the CNRS, structured as a series of alphabetical lists and made up of three volumes. The title of the third volume is slightly different: Les noms de personne sur le territoire de l'ancienne Gaule (Personal Names in the Territory of the former Gaul).

=== Structure ===
- The Personal Names Of The Ancient Territory of Gaul Between The 4th And The 12th Century. - I. - Names from continental Germanic languages and Gallo-Germanic creations. 237 pages - published in 1971 with permission with photomechanic copying of this text with this publish edition in 1968, (no ISBN).
  - The first volume contains almost exclusively an alphabetical list of names originating as indicated by the subtitle of the volume.
- The Personal Names Of The Ancient territory Of Gaul III - The personal names containing with the local names. 563 pages - published in 1985. ISBN 2-222-03427-2.
  - The second volume contains an alphabetical list of names originating as indicated by the subtitle of the volume:
- Volume 3 subtitled Personal Names Contained in place names contains:
  - First part: Latin Names transmitted via Latin: Alphabetical lexicon indicating associated place names for each anthroponym;
  - Second part: Personal names derived from continental Germanic: Alphabetical lexicon indicating associated place names for each anthroponym.
  - A general index with alphabetical list of place names (pages 505 - 540)

=== NPAG and the toponym ===
The three volumes of NPAG are referenced in the works of Ernest Nègre Toponymie générale de la France (volume 1, 1990). The geographical study corresponds to modern France with the work of Ernest Nègre on ancient Gaul with publications by Marie-Thérèse Morlet.

A number of personal names is preceded in NPAG with an asterisk (*). One example are the forms ending with -acum, the name forms with a proprietary name, one example includes the name *Stirpius (derived from *Stirpiacum in which is the etymology of Étréchy) with the explication: The name [of a person] comes from stirps, souche in French; from E. Nègre (TGF § 6359).

== Works ==
- Toponymie de la Thiérache (Toponym of Thiérarche), Artrey, Paris, 1957, 137 p. [pas d'ISBN]
- Étude d'anthroponymie picarde : les noms de personne en Haute Picardie aux XIIIe, XIVe, XVe siècles Picard Anthroponymy Studies: Place Names in Lower Picardy in the 12th, 13th and the 14th Centuries, 468 pages, la Société de linguistique picarde (Picard Linguistics Society) edition, edited for the Musée de Picardie, Amiens, 1967, pas d'ISBN
- Le vocabulaire de la Champagne septentrionale au Moyen âge : essai d'inventaire méthodique, Klincksieck, Paris, 1969, 429 p. [no ISBN]
- Les noms de personne sur le territoire de l'ancienne Gaule du VIe au XIIe siècle, 1971, 1973 et 1985
- Les Études d'onomastique en France : de 1938 à 1970 (The Onomastic Studies In France: From 1938 To 1970), Société d'études linguistiques et anthropologiques de France, Paris, 1981, 214 ISBN 2-85297-070-8
- Dictionnaire étymologique des noms de famille (Etymological Dictionary Of Family Names), 1st edition: Perrin, Paris, 1991, p. 983 ISBN 2-262-00812-4
