= Vert-Toulon =

- Commune
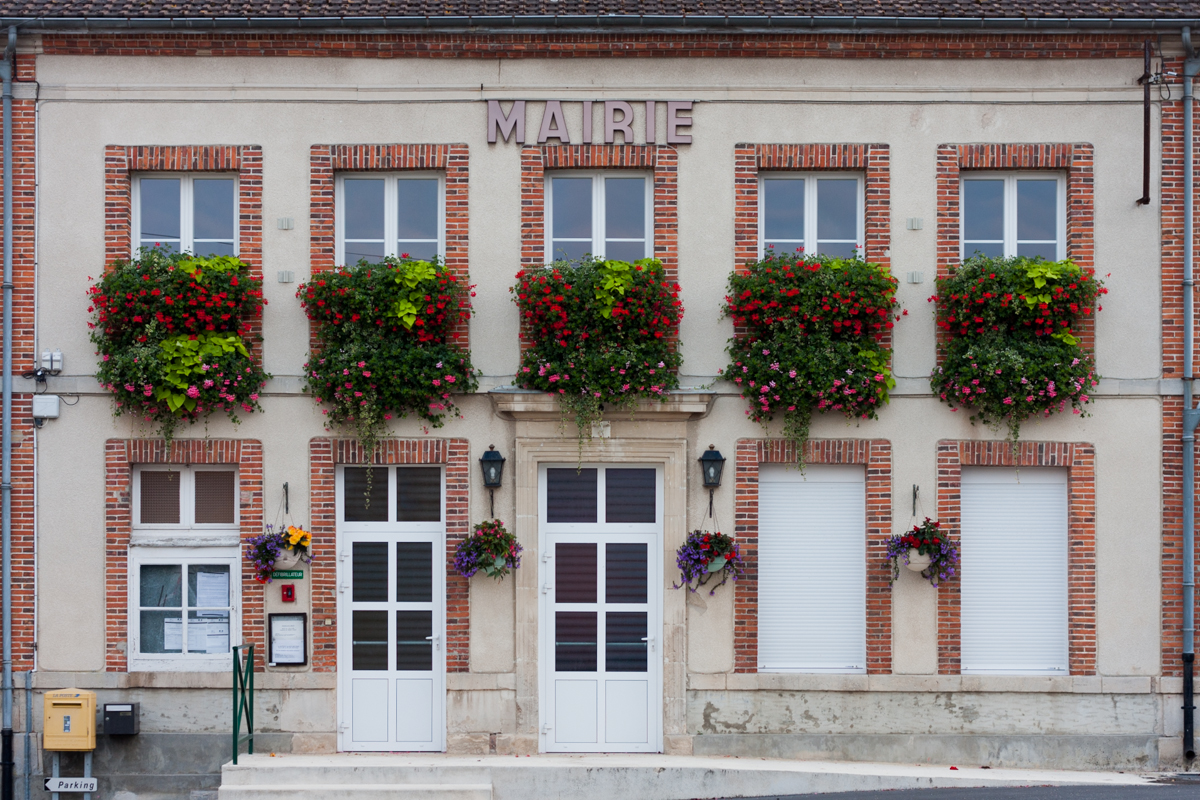
- The town hall in Vert-Toulon
- Location of Vert-Toulon
- Location within France Location within Grand Est
- Coordinates: 48°50′42″N 3°54′45″E
- Country: France
- Region: Grand Est
- Department: Marne
- Arrondissement: Épernay
- Canton: Vertus-Plaine Champenoise
- Intercommunality: CA Épernay, Coteaux et Plaine de Champagne

Government
  - Mayor (2020–2026): Didier Maillard
- Area^{1}: 22.04 km^{2} (8.51 sq mi)
- Highest elevation: 241 m (791 ft)
- Lowest elevation: 139 m (456 ft)
- Population (2023): 281
  - Density: 12.7/km^{2} (33.0/sq mi)
- Time zone: UTC+01:00 (CET)
  - Summer (DST): UTC+02:00 (CEST)
- INSEE/Postal code: 51611 /51130
- ^{1} French Land Register data, which excludes lakes, ponds, glaciers > 1 km^{2} (0.386 sq mi or 247 acres) and river estuaries.

Vert-Toulon is a commune in the Marne department in north-eastern France. As of 2023, the population of the commune was 281. As of 2019, there are 159 dwellings in the commune, of which 129 primary residences.

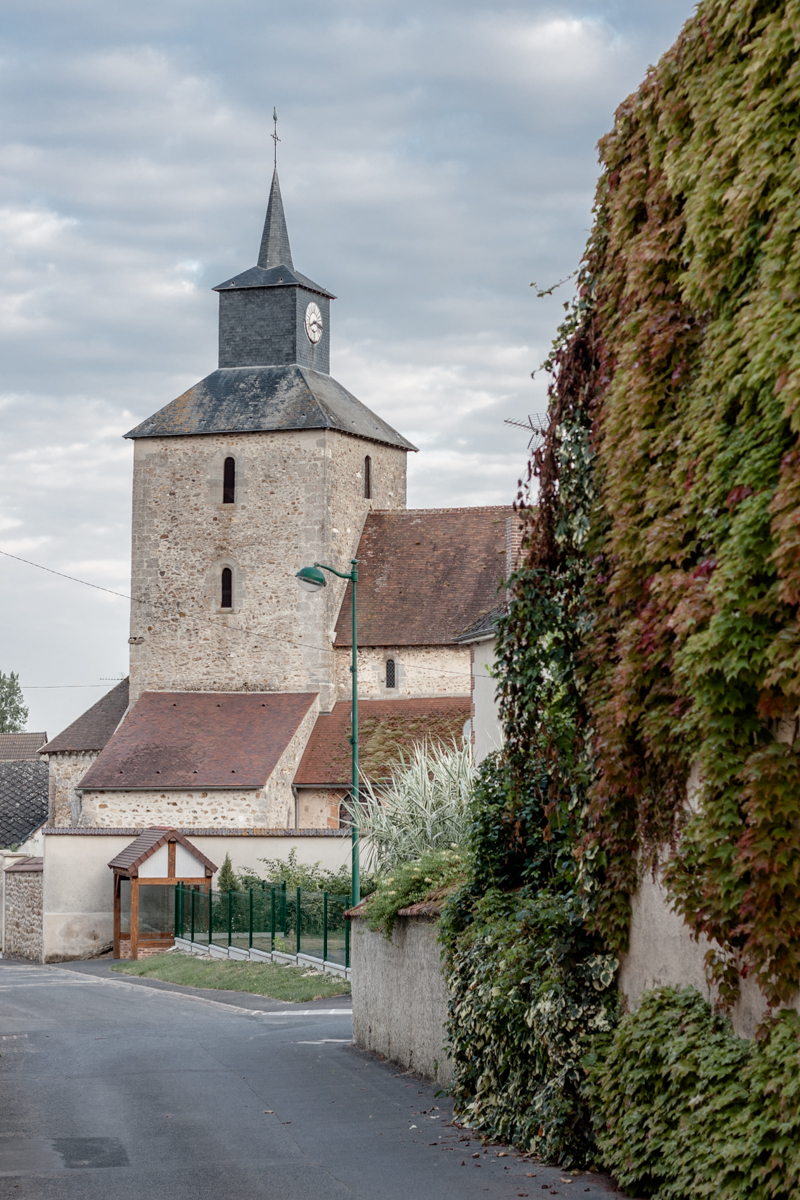
Église Saint-Pierre de Vert-la-Gravelle

== See also ==
- Communes of the Marne department
