= Chaintrix-Bierges =

- Commune
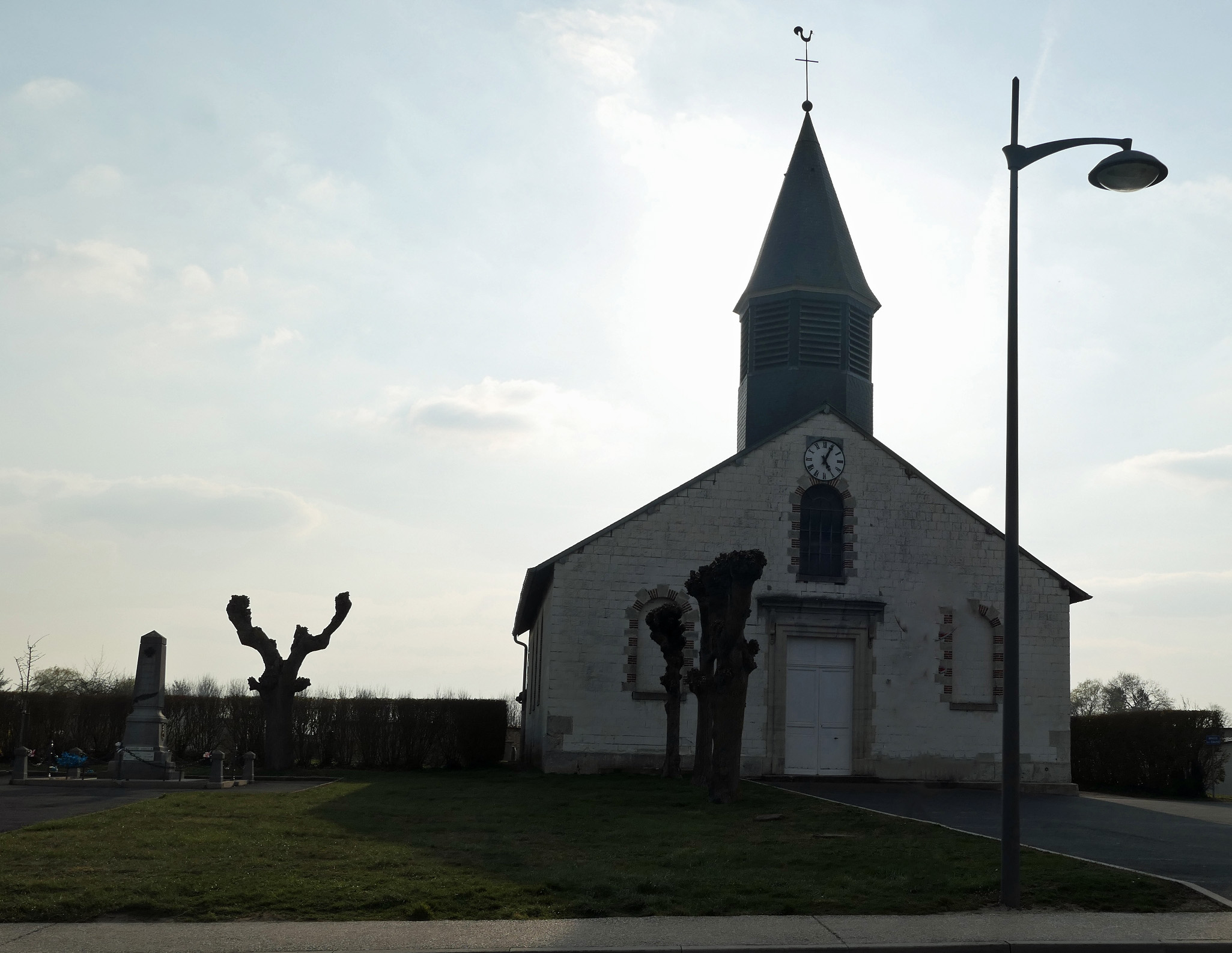
- Location of Chaintrix-Bierges
- Location within France Location within Grand Est
- Coordinates: 48°54′09″N 4°06′27″E
- Country: France
- Region: Grand Est
- Department: Marne
- Arrondissement: Épernay
- Canton: Vertus-Plaine Champenoise
- Intercommunality: CA Épernay, Coteaux et Plaine de Champagne

Government
  - Mayor (2023–2026): Christophe Maillet
- Area^{1}: 10.31 km^{2} (3.98 sq mi)
- Elevation: 102 m (335 ft)
- Population (2023): 345
  - Density: 33.5/km^{2} (86.7/sq mi)
- Time zone: UTC+01:00 (CET)
  - Summer (DST): UTC+02:00 (CEST)
- INSEE/Postal code: 51107 /51130
- ^{1} French Land Register data, which excludes lakes, ponds, glaciers > 1 km^{2} (0.386 sq mi or 247 acres) and river estuaries.

Chaintrix-Bierges (French pronunciation: [ʃɛ̃tʁi bjɛʁʒ]) is a commune in the Marne department in north-eastern France.

== See also ==
- Communes of the Marne department
