= Chaltrait =

- Commune
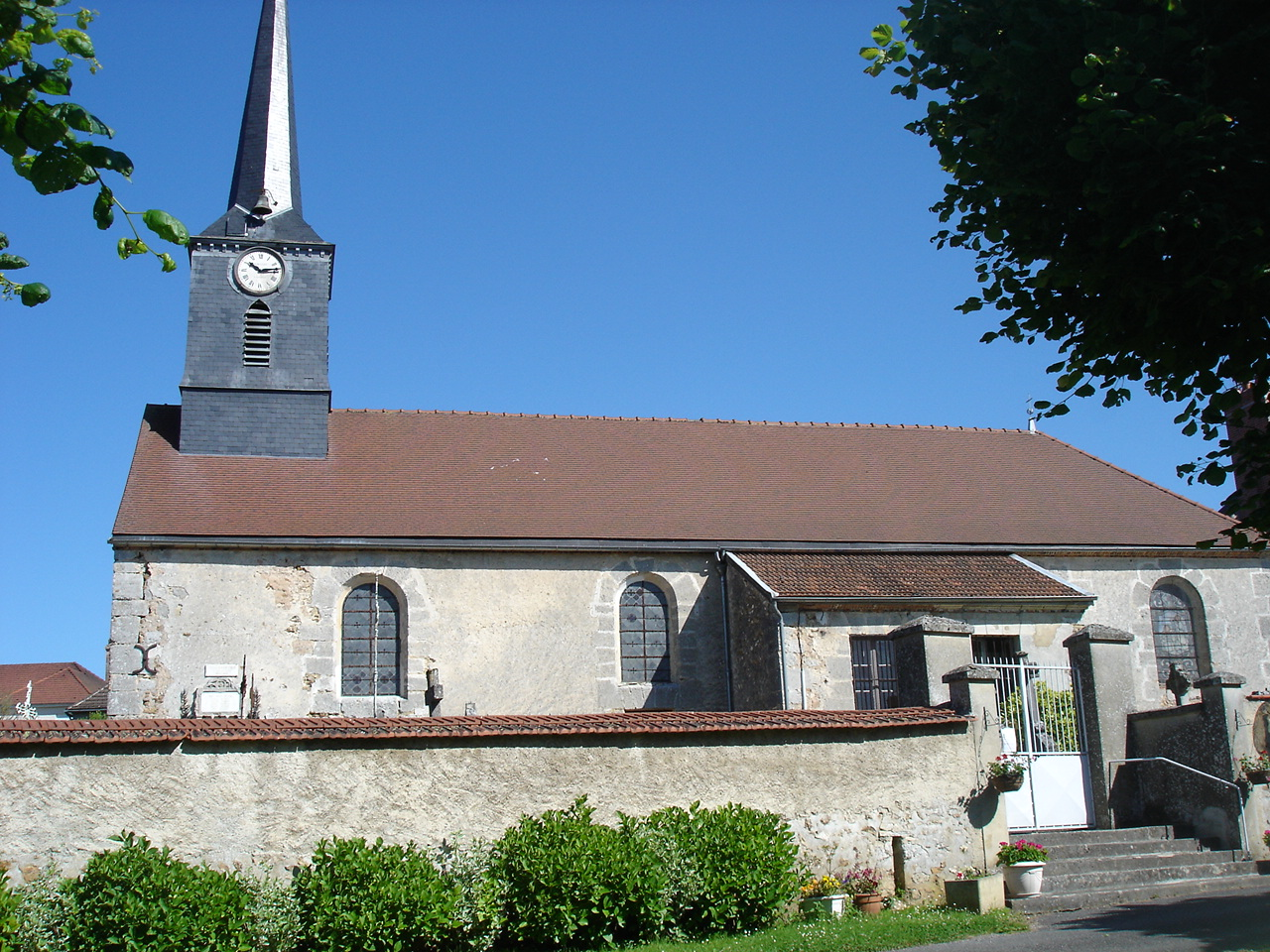
- The church in Chaltrait
- Location of Chaltrait
- Location within France Location within Grand Est
- Coordinates: 48°55′51″N 3°53′50″E
- Country: France
- Region: Grand Est
- Department: Marne
- Arrondissement: Épernay
- Canton: Vertus-Plaine Champenoise
- Intercommunality: CA Épernay, Coteaux et Plaine de Champagne

Government
  - Mayor (2020–2026): Sylvie Rouillère
- Area^{1}: 6.69 km^{2} (2.58 sq mi)
- Elevation: 240 m (790 ft)
- Population (2023): 60
  - Density: 9.0/km^{2} (23/sq mi)
- Time zone: UTC+01:00 (CET)
  - Summer (DST): UTC+02:00 (CEST)
- INSEE/Postal code: 51110 /51130
- ^{1} French Land Register data, which excludes lakes, ponds, glaciers > 1 km^{2} (0.386 sq mi or 247 acres) and river estuaries.

Chaltrait (French pronunciation: [ʃaltʁɛ]) is a village and commune in the Marne département of north-eastern France.

== See also ==
- Communes of the Marne department
