= Villeseneux =

- Commune
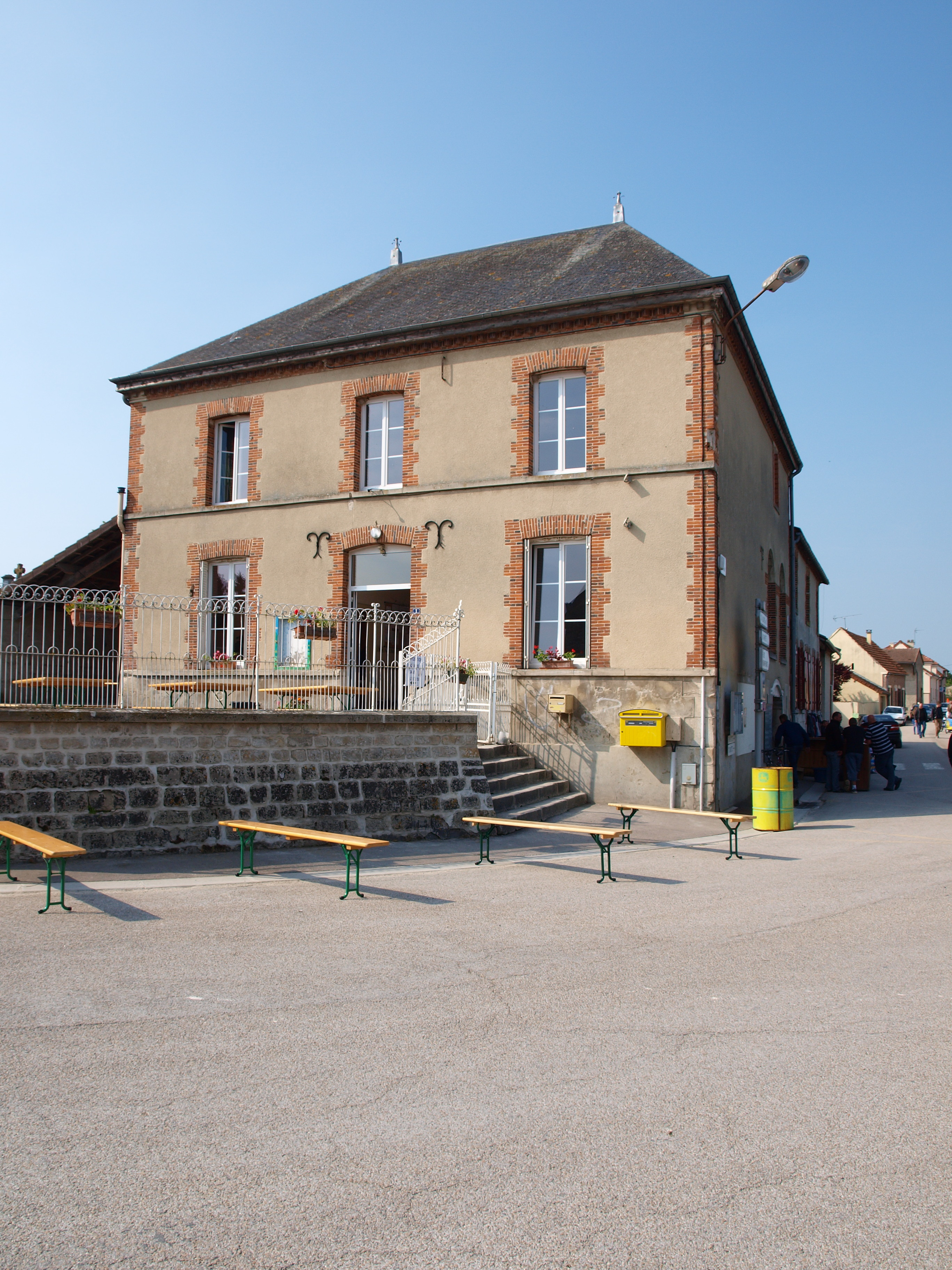
- The town hall in Villeseneux
- Location of Villeseneux
- Location within France Location within Grand Est
- Coordinates: 48°50′31″N 4°08′49″E
- Country: France
- Region: Grand Est
- Department: Marne
- Arrondissement: Épernay
- Canton: Vertus-Plaine Champenoise
- Intercommunality: CA Épernay, Coteaux et Plaine de Champagne

Government
  - Mayor (2020–2026): Pascal Adam
- Area^{1}: 25.86 km^{2} (9.98 sq mi)
- Elevation: 233 m (764 ft)
- Population (2023): 199
  - Density: 7.70/km^{2} (19.9/sq mi)
- Time zone: UTC+01:00 (CET)
  - Summer (DST): UTC+02:00 (CEST)
- INSEE/Postal code: 51638 /51130
- ^{1} French Land Register data, which excludes lakes, ponds, glaciers > 1 km^{2} (0.386 sq mi or 247 acres) and river estuaries.

Villeseneux (French pronunciation: [vilsənø]) is a commune in the Marne department in north-eastern France.

== See also ==
- Communes of the Marne department
