= Val-des-Marais =

- Commune
- Location of Val-des-Marais
- Location within France Location within Grand Est
- Coordinates: 48°50′43″N 3°57′54″E
- Country: France
- Region: Grand Est
- Department: Marne
- Arrondissement: Épernay
- Canton: Vertus-Plaine Champenoise
- Intercommunality: CA Épernay, Coteaux et Plaine de Champagne

Government
  - Mayor (2020–2026): George Gentil
- Area^{1}: 39.85 km^{2} (15.39 sq mi)
- Elevation: 150 m (490 ft)
- Population (2023): 549
  - Density: 13.8/km^{2} (35.7/sq mi)
- Time zone: UTC+01:00 (CET)
  - Summer (DST): UTC+02:00 (CEST)
- INSEE/Postal code: 51158 /51130
- ^{1} French Land Register data, which excludes lakes, ponds, glaciers > 1 km^{2} (0.386 sq mi or 247 acres) and river estuaries.

Val-des-Marais (French pronunciation: [val de maʁɛ]) is a commune in the Marne department in the Grand Est region in north-eastern France.

== See also ==
- Communes of the Marne department
