= Soulières =

- Commune
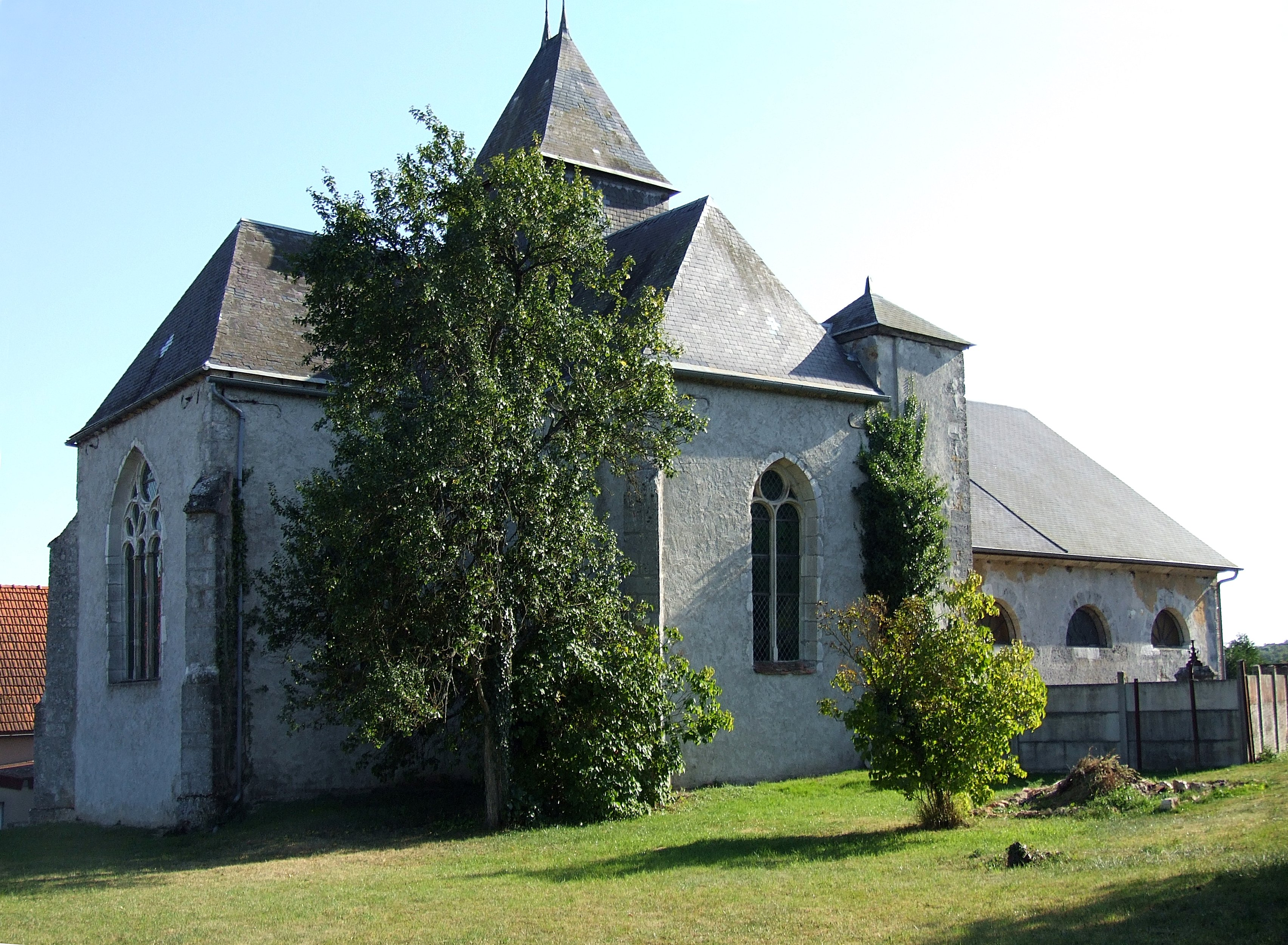
- The church in Soulières
- Location of Soulières
- Location within France Location within Grand Est
- Coordinates: 48°54′23″N 3°55′43″E
- Country: France
- Region: Grand Est
- Department: Marne
- Arrondissement: Épernay
- Canton: Vertus-Plaine Champenoise
- Intercommunality: CA Épernay, Coteaux et Plaine de Champagne

Government
  - Mayor (2020–2026): Max Denis
- Area^{1}: 6.04 km^{2} (2.33 sq mi)
- Elevation: 196 m (643 ft)
- Population (2023): 143
  - Density: 23.7/km^{2} (61.3/sq mi)
- Time zone: UTC+01:00 (CET)
  - Summer (DST): UTC+02:00 (CEST)
- INSEE/Postal code: 51558 /51130
- ^{1} French Land Register data, which excludes lakes, ponds, glaciers > 1 km^{2} (0.386 sq mi or 247 acres) and river estuaries.

Soulières (French pronunciation: [suljɛʁ]) is a commune in the Marne department in north-eastern France.

== See also ==
- Communes of the Marne department
