= Écury-le-Repos =

- Commune
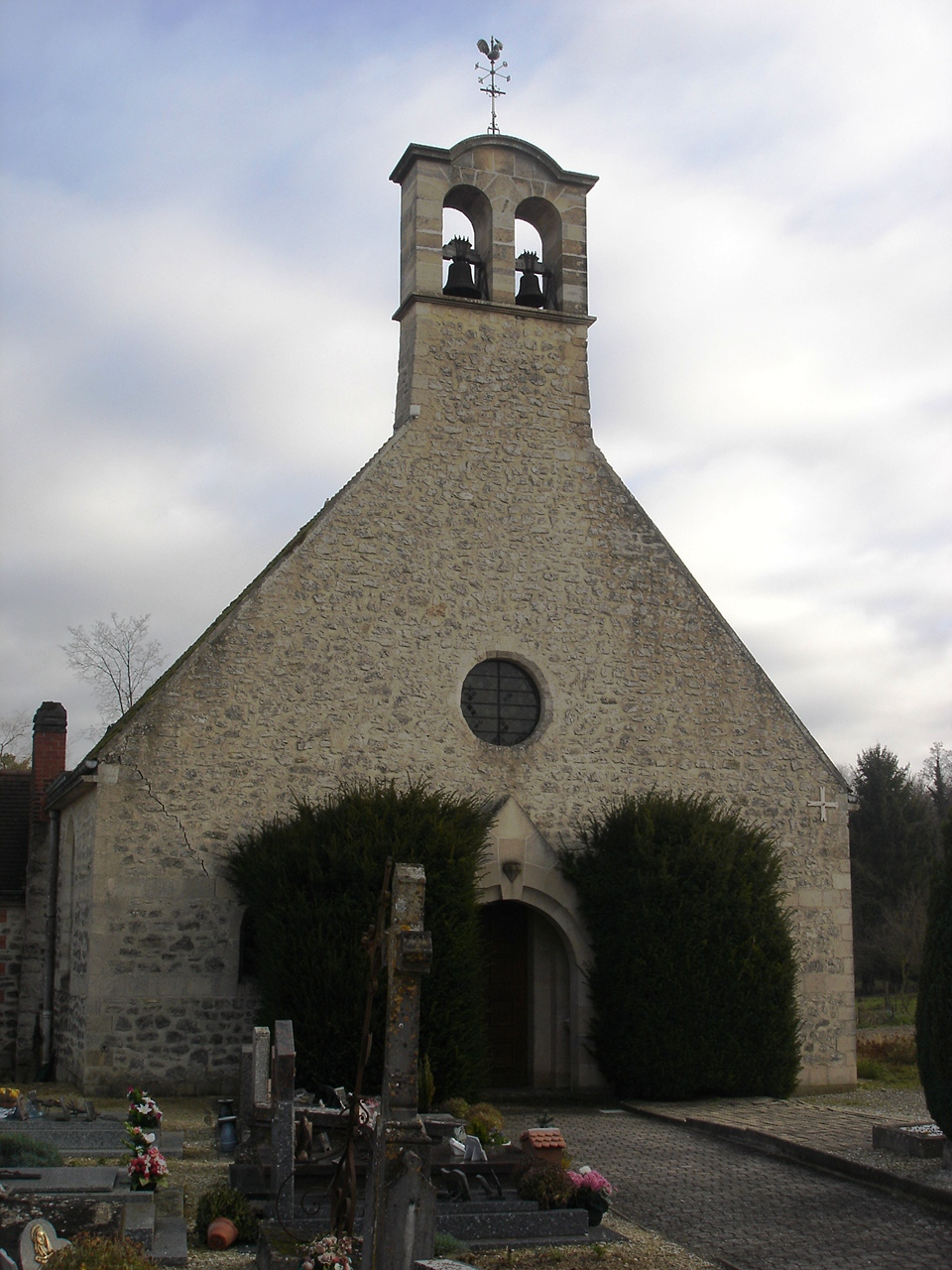
- The church in Écury-le-Repos
- Location of Écury-le-Repos
- Location within France Location within Grand Est
- Coordinates: 48°48′29″N 4°02′39″E
- Country: France
- Region: Grand Est
- Department: Marne
- Arrondissement: Épernay
- Canton: Vertus-Plaine Champenoise
- Intercommunality: CA Épernay, Coteaux et Plaine de Champagne

Government
  - Mayor (2020–2026): Antony Loppin
- Area^{1}: 9.96 km^{2} (3.85 sq mi)
- Highest elevation: 167 m (548 ft)
- Lowest elevation: 122 m (400 ft)
- Population (2023): 62
  - Density: 6.2/km^{2} (16/sq mi)
- Time zone: UTC+01:00 (CET)
  - Summer (DST): UTC+02:00 (CEST)
- INSEE/Postal code: 51226 /51230
- ^{1} French Land Register data, which excludes lakes, ponds, glaciers > 1 km^{2} (0.386 sq mi or 247 acres) and river estuaries.

Écury-le-Repos (French pronunciation: [ekyʁi lə ʁəpo]) is a commune in the Marne department in north-eastern France.

== See also ==
- Communes of the Marne department
