= Vélye =

- Commune
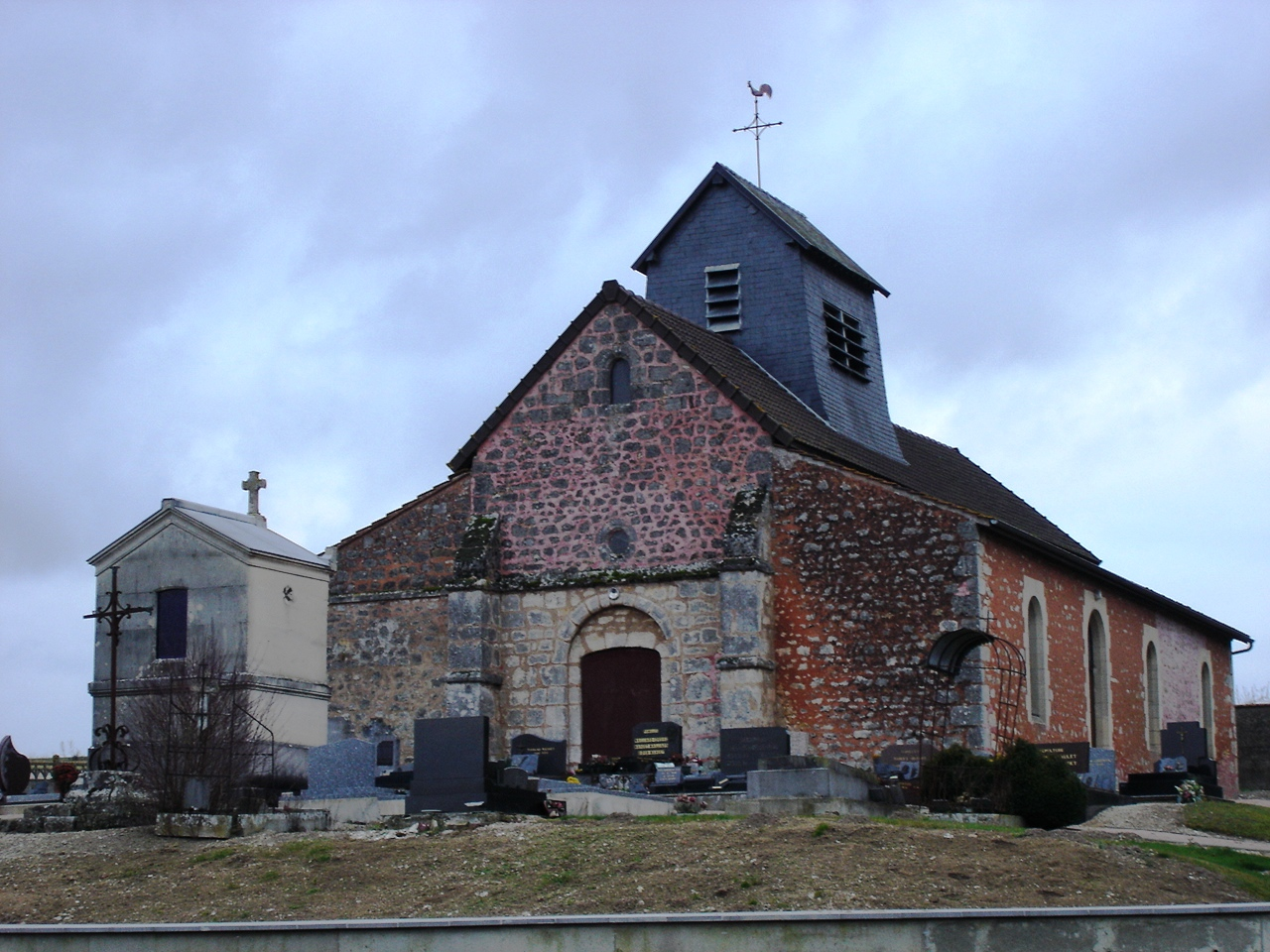
- The church in Velye
- Location of Vélye
- Location within France Location within Grand Est
- Coordinates: 48°53′17″N 4°07′37″E
- Country: France
- Region: Grand Est
- Department: Marne
- Arrondissement: Épernay
- Canton: Vertus-Plaine Champenoise
- Intercommunality: CA Épernay, Coteaux et Plaine de Champagne

Government
  - Mayor (2020–2026): Marie-Laure Werbrouck
- Area^{1}: 10.68 km^{2} (4.12 sq mi)
- Highest elevation: 137 m (449 ft)
- Lowest elevation: 94 m (308 ft)
- Population (2023): 228
  - Density: 21.3/km^{2} (55.3/sq mi)
- Time zone: UTC+01:00 (CET)
  - Summer (DST): UTC+02:00 (CEST)
- INSEE/Postal code: 51603 /51130
- ^{1} French Land Register data, which excludes lakes, ponds, glaciers > 1 km^{2} (0.386 sq mi or 247 acres) and river estuaries.

Vélye (French pronunciation: [veli]) is a commune in the Marne department in north-eastern France. The inhabitants are called Velytiots in French.

== See also ==
- Communes of the Marne department
