= Germinon =

- Commune
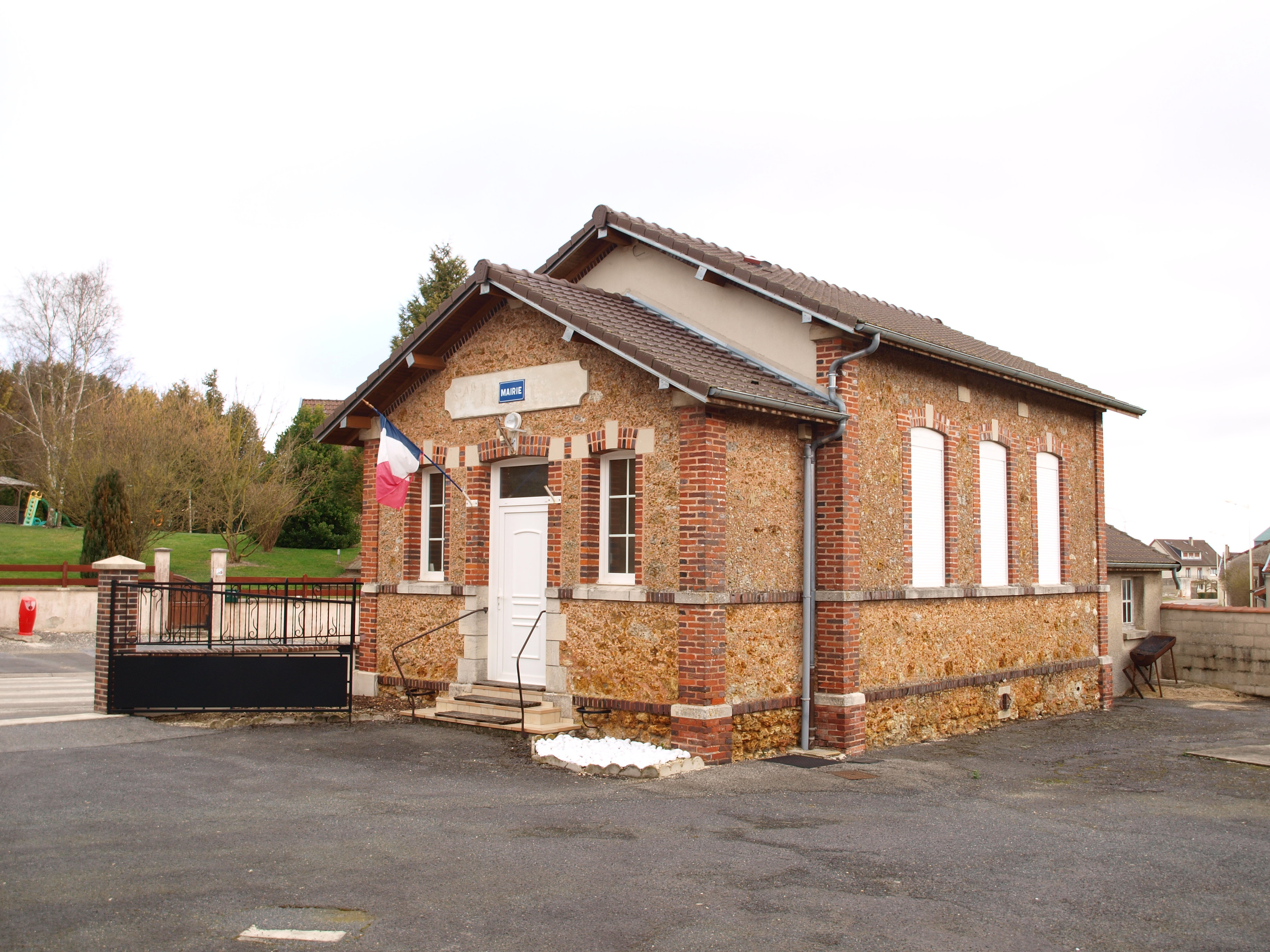
- The town hall in Germinon
- Location of Germinon
- Location within France Location within Grand Est
- Coordinates: 48°52′41″N 4°09′20″E
- Country: France
- Region: Grand Est
- Department: Marne
- Arrondissement: Épernay
- Canton: Vertus-Plaine Champenoise
- Intercommunality: CA Épernay, Coteaux et Plaine de Champagne

Government
  - Mayor (2020–2026): Patricia Colardelle
- Area^{1}: 19.61 km^{2} (7.57 sq mi)
- Elevation: 108 m (354 ft)
- Population (2023): 190
  - Density: 9.7/km^{2} (25/sq mi)
- Time zone: UTC+01:00 (CET)
  - Summer (DST): UTC+02:00 (CEST)
- INSEE/Postal code: 51268 /51130
- ^{1} French Land Register data, which excludes lakes, ponds, glaciers > 1 km^{2} (0.386 sq mi or 247 acres) and river estuaries.

Germinon (French pronunciation: [ʒɛʁminɔ̃]) is a commune in the Marne department in north-eastern France.

== See also ==
- Communes of the Marne department
