= Étréchy =

Étréchy may refer to the following places in France:

- Étréchy, Cher, a commune in the department of Cher
- Étréchy, Marne, a commune in the department of Marne
- Étréchy, Essonne, a commune in the department of Essonne
