= Bergères-lès-Vertus =

- Commune
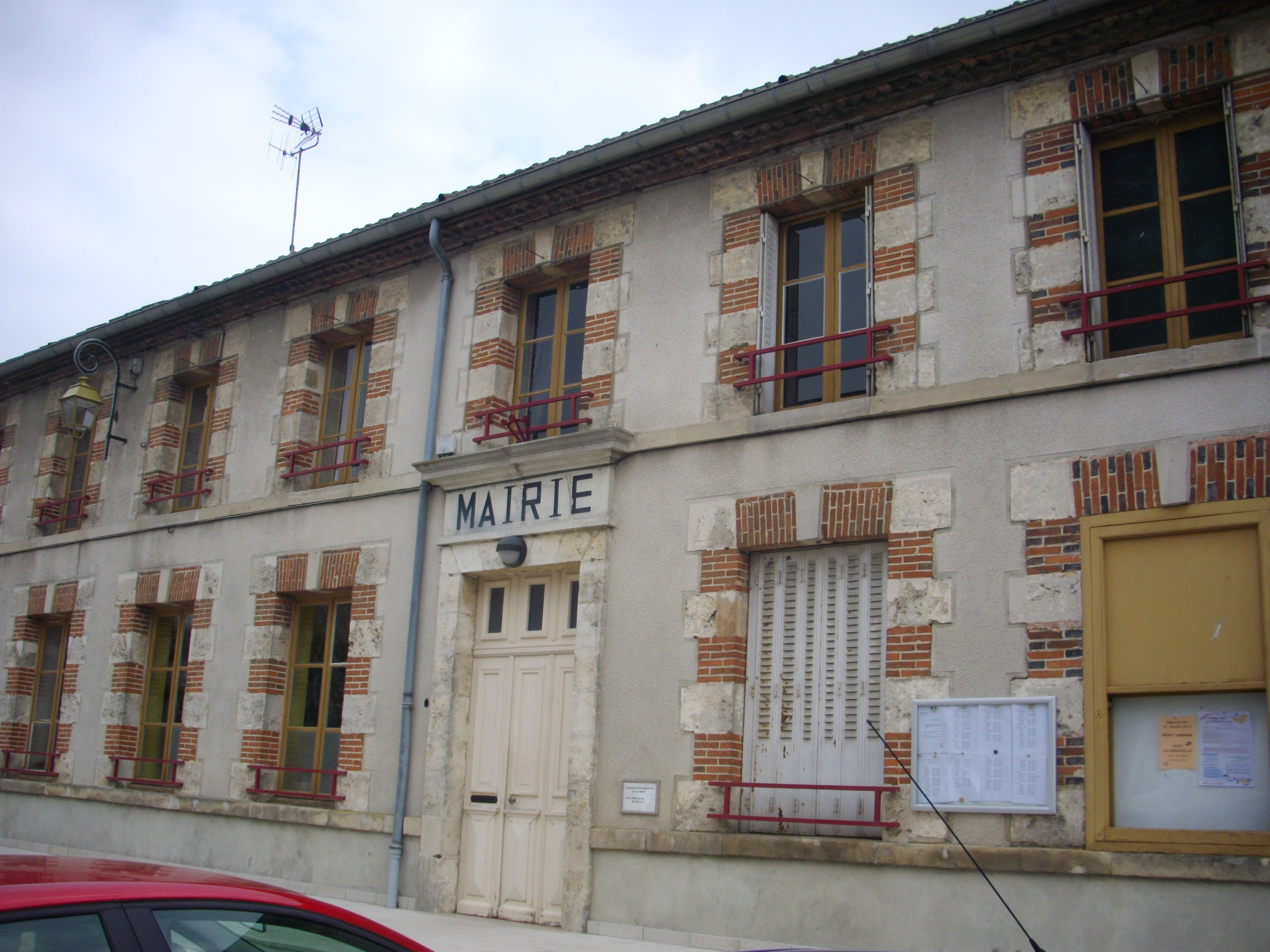
- The town hall in Bergères-lès-Vertus
- Location of Bergères-lès-Vertus
- Location within France Location within Grand Est
- Coordinates: 48°52′49″N 4°00′16″E
- Country: France
- Region: Grand Est
- Department: Marne
- Arrondissement: Épernay
- Canton: Vertus-Plaine Champenoise
- Intercommunality: CA Épernay, Coteaux et Plaine de Champagne

Government
  - Mayor (2020–2026): Eva Vautrelle
- Area^{1}: 18.28 km^{2} (7.06 sq mi)
- Elevation: 114 m (374 ft)
- Population (2023): 596
  - Density: 32.6/km^{2} (84.4/sq mi)
- Time zone: UTC+01:00 (CET)
  - Summer (DST): UTC+02:00 (CEST)
- INSEE/Postal code: 51049 /51130
- ^{1} French Land Register data, which excludes lakes, ponds, glaciers > 1 km^{2} (0.386 sq mi or 247 acres) and river estuaries.

Bergères-lès-Vertus (French pronunciation: [bɛʁʒɛʁ lɛ vɛʁty]) is a commune in the Marne department in northeastern France.

== Population ==
Historical population
| Year | Pop. | ±% p.a. |
|---|---|---|
| 1968 | 517 | — |
| 1975 | 512 | −0.14% |
| 1982 | 510 | −0.06% |
| 1990 | 536 | +0.62% |
| 1999 | 540 | +0.08% |
| 2007 | 556 | +0.37% |
| 2012 | 588 | +1.13% |
| 2017 | 615 | +0.90% |
| 2023 | 596 | −0.52% |
Source: INSEE

== See also ==
- Communes of the Marne department
