= Pocancy =

- Commune
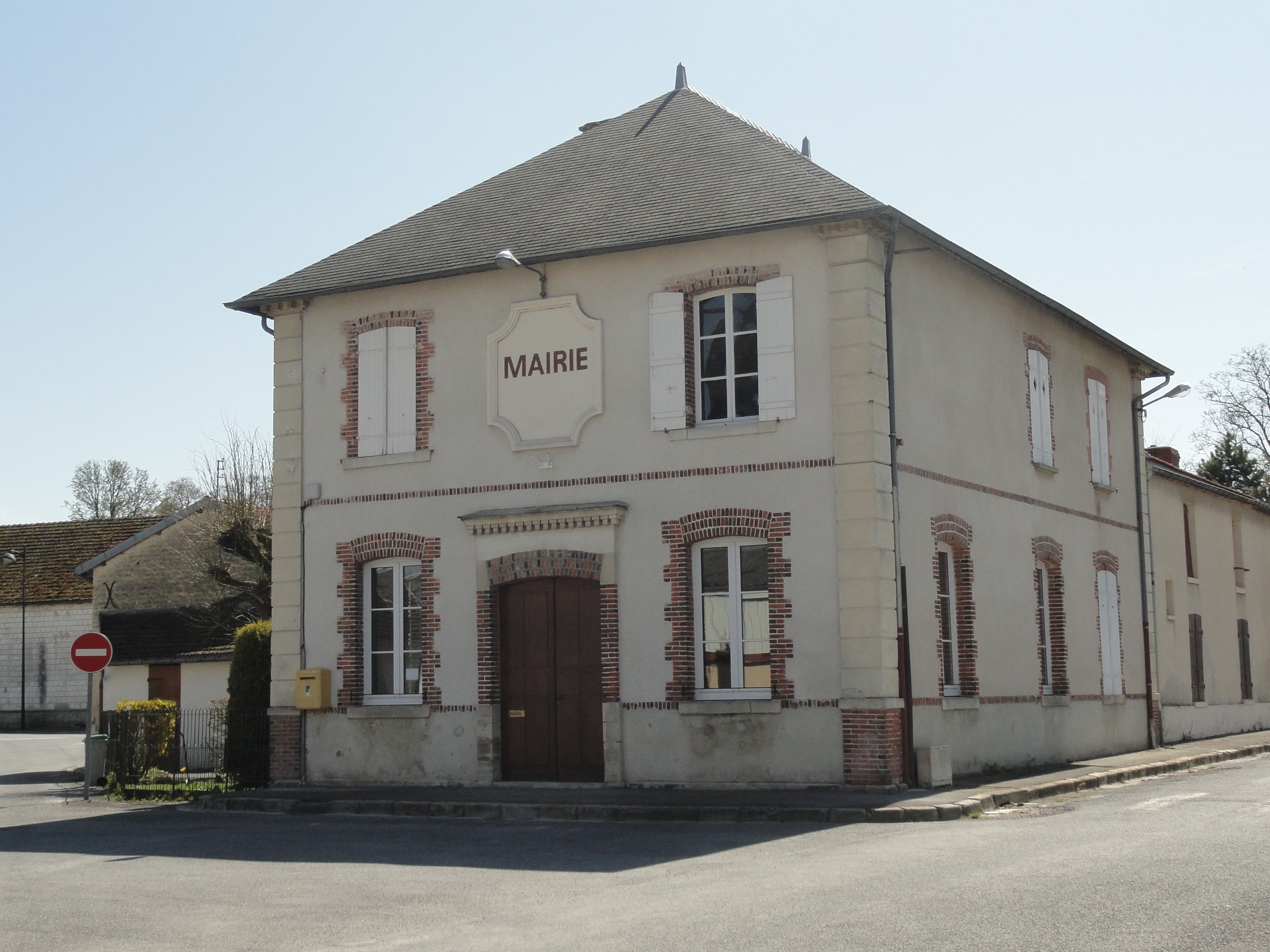
- The town hall in Pocancy

- Coat of arms
- Location of Pocancy
- Location within France Location within Grand Est
- Coordinates: 48°56′53″N 4°08′50″E
- Country: France
- Region: Grand Est
- Department: Marne
- Arrondissement: Épernay
- Canton: Vertus-Plaine Champenoise
- Intercommunality: CA Épernay, Coteaux et Plaine de Champagne

Government
  - Mayor (2020–2026): Laurent Ravillion
- Area^{1}: 26.93 km^{2} (10.40 sq mi)
- Elevation: 89 m (292 ft)
- Population (2023): 175
  - Density: 6.50/km^{2} (16.8/sq mi)
- Time zone: UTC+01:00 (CET)
  - Summer (DST): UTC+02:00 (CEST)
- INSEE/Postal code: 51435 /51130
- ^{1} French Land Register data, which excludes lakes, ponds, glaciers > 1 km^{2} (0.386 sq mi or 247 acres) and river estuaries.

Pocancy (French pronunciation: [pɔkɑ̃si]) is a commune in the Marne department in north-eastern France.

== See also ==
- Communes of the Marne department
