= Clamanges =

- Commune
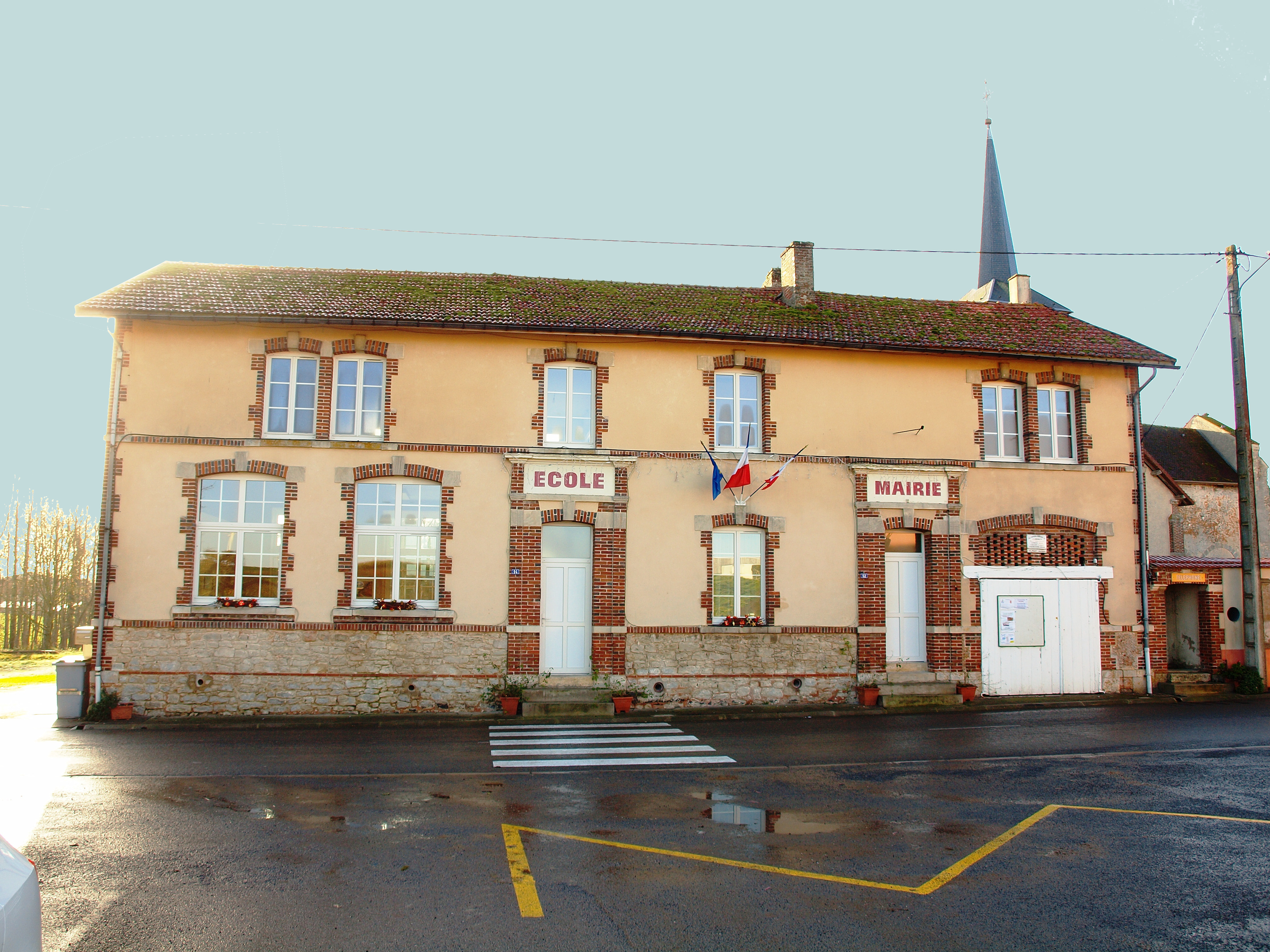
- The town hall in Clamanges
- Location of Clamanges
- Location within France Location within Grand Est
- Coordinates: 48°49′43″N 4°05′03″E
- Country: France
- Region: Grand Est
- Department: Marne
- Arrondissement: Épernay
- Canton: Vertus-Plaine Champenoise
- Intercommunality: CA Épernay, Coteaux et Plaine de Champagne

Government
  - Mayor (2020–2026): Jean-Luc Ferrand
- Area^{1}: 23.59 km^{2} (9.11 sq mi)
- Elevation: 123 m (404 ft)
- Population (2023): 228
  - Density: 9.67/km^{2} (25.0/sq mi)
- Time zone: UTC+01:00 (CET)
  - Summer (DST): UTC+02:00 (CEST)
- INSEE/Postal code: 51154 /51130
- ^{1} French Land Register data, which excludes lakes, ponds, glaciers > 1 km^{2} (0.386 sq mi or 247 acres) and river estuaries.

Clamanges (French pronunciation: [klamɑ̃ʒ]) is a commune in the Marne department in north-eastern France.

== See also ==
- Communes of the Marne department
