= Trécon =

- Commune
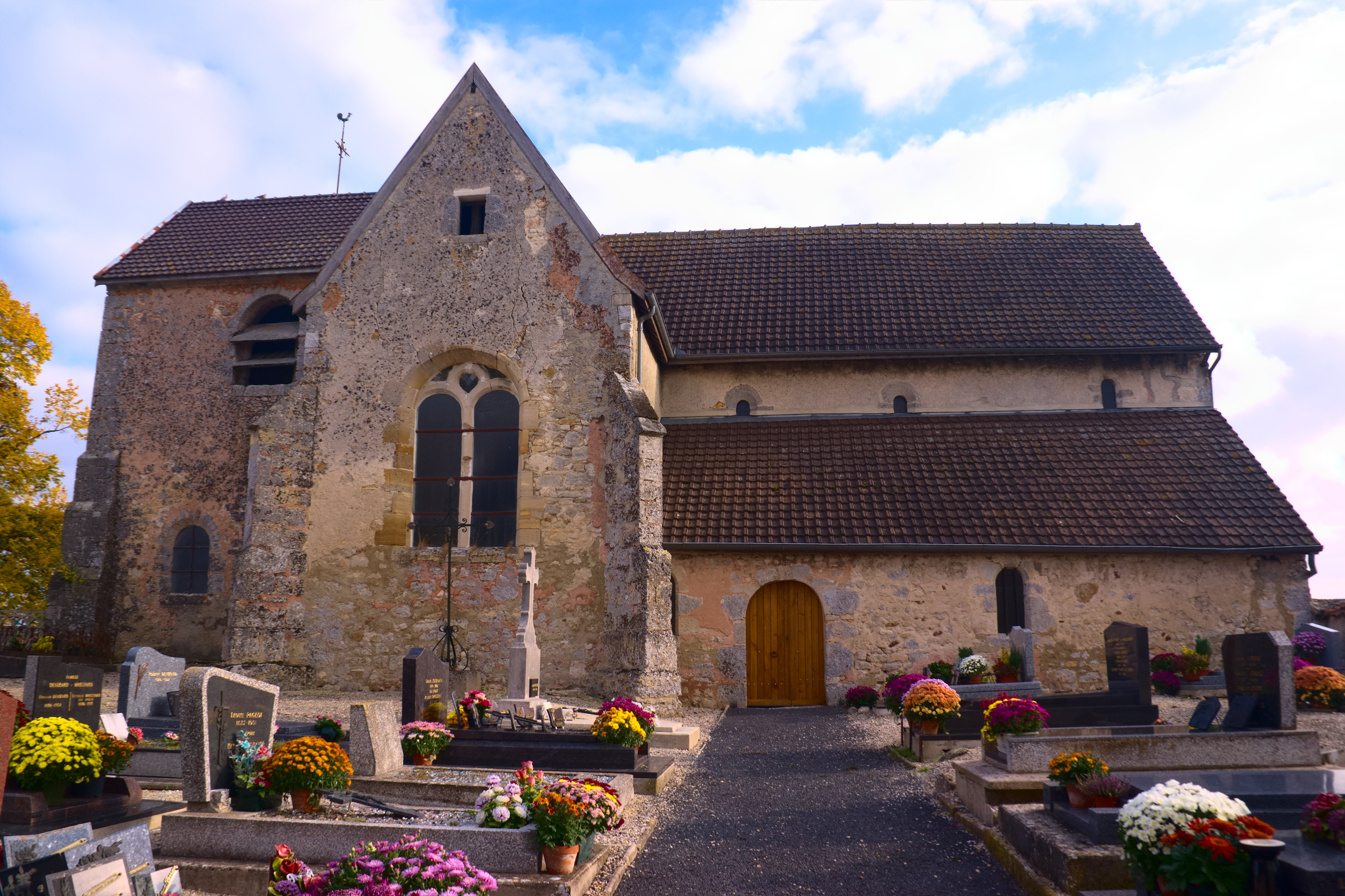
- The church in Trécon
- Location of Trécon
- Location within France Location within Grand Est
- Coordinates: 48°52′14″N 4°04′58″E
- Country: France
- Region: Grand Est
- Department: Marne
- Arrondissement: Épernay
- Canton: Vertus-Plaine Champenoise
- Intercommunality: CA Épernay, Coteaux et Plaine de Champagne

Government
  - Mayor (2020–2026): Georges Leherle
- Area^{1}: 12.45 km^{2} (4.81 sq mi)
- Elevation: 120 m (390 ft)
- Population (2023): 83
  - Density: 6.7/km^{2} (17/sq mi)
- Time zone: UTC+01:00 (CET)
  - Summer (DST): UTC+02:00 (CEST)
- INSEE/Postal code: 51578 /51130
- ^{1} French Land Register data, which excludes lakes, ponds, glaciers > 1 km^{2} (0.386 sq mi or 247 acres) and river estuaries.

Trécon (French pronunciation: [tʁekɔ̃]) is a commune in the Marne department in north-eastern France.

== See also ==
- Communes of the Marne department
