= Communauté d'agglomération Épernay, Coteaux et Plaine de Champagne =

Épernay, Coteaux et Plaine de Champagne
- Communauté d'agglomération
- Interactive map of Épernay, Coteaux et Plaine de Champagne
- Coordinates: 48°56′N 04°01′E
- Country: France
- Region: Grand Est
- Department: Marne
- No. of communes: {{{nbcomm}}}
- Established: 2017
- Area: 586.9 km^{2} (226.6 sq mi)
- Population (2019): 47,514
  - Density: 80.96/km^{2} (209.7/sq mi)
- Website: www.epernay-agglo.fr

Communauté d'agglomération Épernay, Coteaux et Plaine de Champagne is the communauté d'agglomération, an intercommunal structure, centred on the town of Épernay. It is located in the Marne department, in the Grand Est region, northeastern France. Created in 2017, its seat is in Épernay. Its area is 586.9 km^{2}. Its population was 47,514 in 2019, of which 22,433 in Épernay proper.

== Composition ==
The communauté d'agglomération consists of the following 47 communes:

1. Athis
2. Avize
3. Bergères-lès-Vertus
4. Blancs-Coteaux
5. Brugny-Vaudancourt
6. Chaintrix-Bierges
7. Chaltrait
8. Chavot-Courcourt
9. Chouilly
10. Clamanges
11. Cramant
12. Cuis
13. Cumières
14. Écury-le-Repos
15. Épernay
16. Étréchy
17. Flavigny
18. Germinon
19. Givry-lès-Loisy
20. Grauves
21. Les Istres-et-Bury
22. Loisy-en-Brie
23. Magenta
24. Mancy
25. Mardeuil
26. Le Mesnil-sur-Oger
27. Monthelon
28. Morangis
29. Moslins
30. Moussy
31. Oiry
32. Pierre-Morains
33. Pierry
34. Plivot
35. Pocancy
36. Rouffy
37. Saint-Mard-lès-Rouffy
38. Soulières
39. Trécon
40. Val-des-Marais
41. Vélye
42. Vert-Toulon
43. Villeneuve-Renneville-Chevigny
44. Villers-aux-Bois
45. Villeseneux
46. Vinay
47. Vouzy
