= Villers-aux-Bois =

- Commune
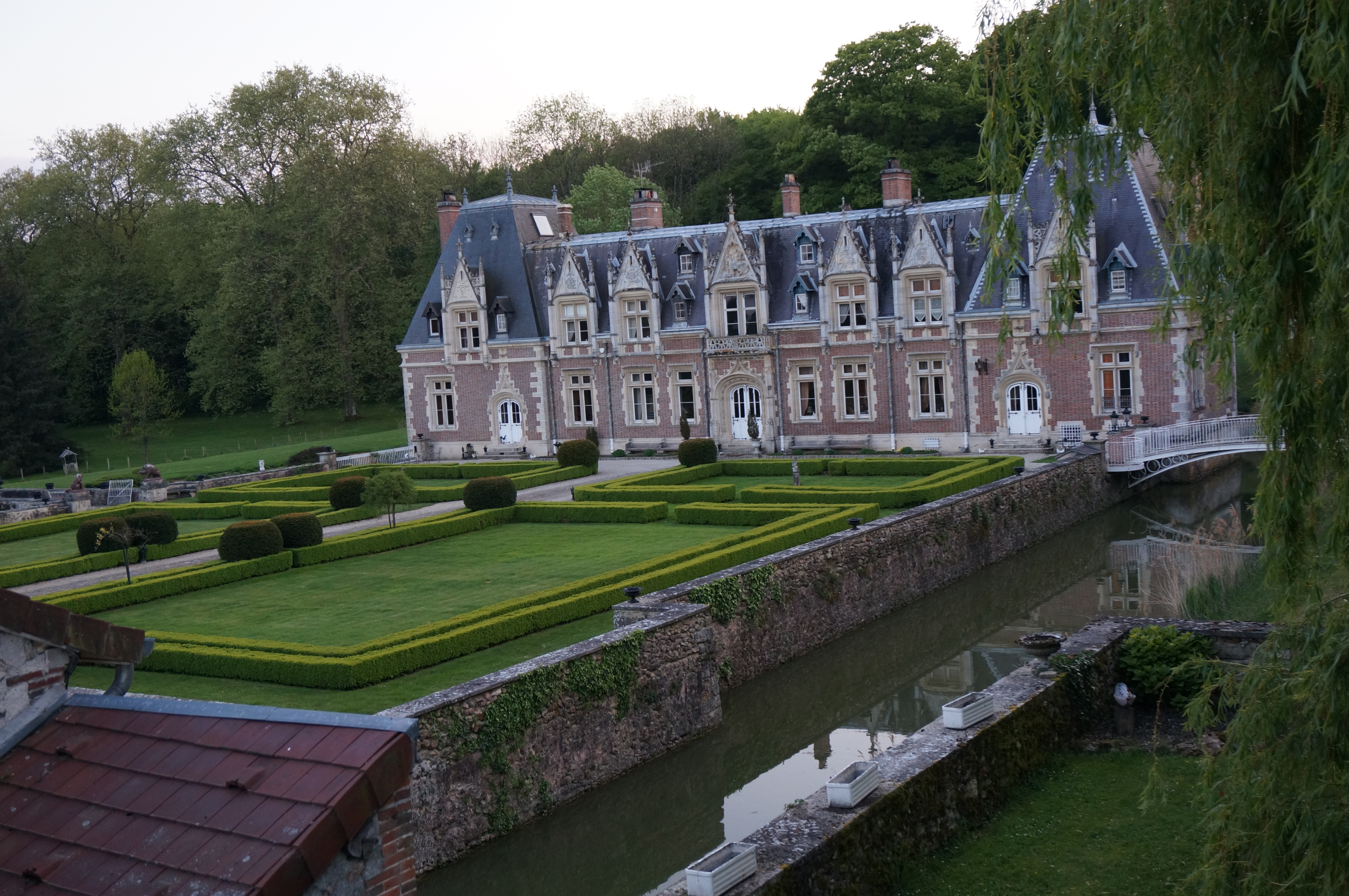
- The chateau in Villers-aux-Bois
- Location of Villers-aux-Bois
- Location within France Location within Grand Est
- Coordinates: 48°56′04″N 3°56′14″E
- Country: France
- Region: Grand Est
- Department: Marne
- Arrondissement: Épernay
- Canton: Vertus-Plaine Champenoise
- Intercommunality: CA Épernay, Coteaux et Plaine de Champagne

Government
  - Mayor (2020–2026): Philippe Claudotte
- Area^{1}: 5.11 km^{2} (1.97 sq mi)
- Elevation: 230 m (750 ft)
- Population (2023): 311
  - Density: 60.9/km^{2} (158/sq mi)
- Time zone: UTC+01:00 (CET)
  - Summer (DST): UTC+02:00 (CEST)
- INSEE/Postal code: 51630 /51130
- ^{1} French Land Register data, which excludes lakes, ponds, glaciers > 1 km^{2} (0.386 sq mi or 247 acres) and river estuaries.

Villers-aux-Bois (French pronunciation: [vilɛʁ o bwa]) is a commune in the Marne department in north-eastern France.

== See also ==
- Communes of the Marne department
