= Villeneuve-Renneville-Chevigny =

- Commune
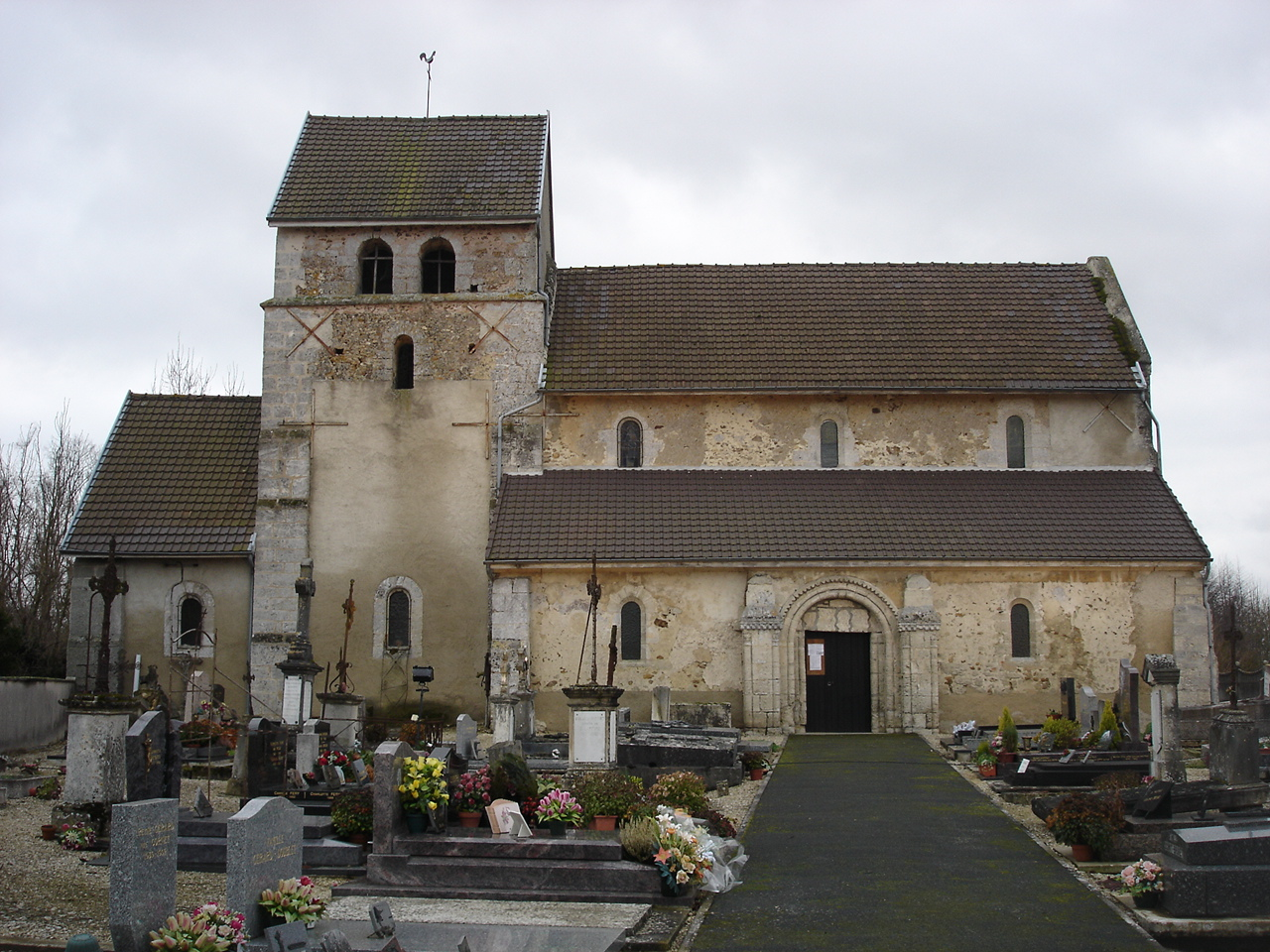
- The church in Villeneuve-Renneville-Chevigny
- Location of Villeneuve-Renneville-Chevigny
- Location within France Location within Grand Est
- Coordinates: 48°55′10″N 4°03′45″E
- Country: France
- Region: Grand Est
- Department: Marne
- Arrondissement: Épernay
- Canton: Vertus-Plaine Champenoise
- Intercommunality: CA Épernay, Coteaux et Plaine de Champagne

Government
  - Mayor (2020–2026): Damien Grzeszczak
- Area^{1}: 17.17 km^{2} (6.63 sq mi)
- Elevation: 96 m (315 ft)
- Population (2023): 326
  - Density: 19.0/km^{2} (49.2/sq mi)
- Time zone: UTC+01:00 (CET)
  - Summer (DST): UTC+02:00 (CEST)
- INSEE/Postal code: 51627 /51130
- ^{1} French Land Register data, which excludes lakes, ponds, glaciers > 1 km^{2} (0.386 sq mi or 247 acres) and river estuaries.

Villeneuve-Renneville-Chevigny (French pronunciation: [vilnœv ʁɛnvil ʃəviɲi]) is a commune in the Marne department in north-eastern France.

== See also ==
- Communes of the Marne department
