= Loisy-en-Brie =

- Commune
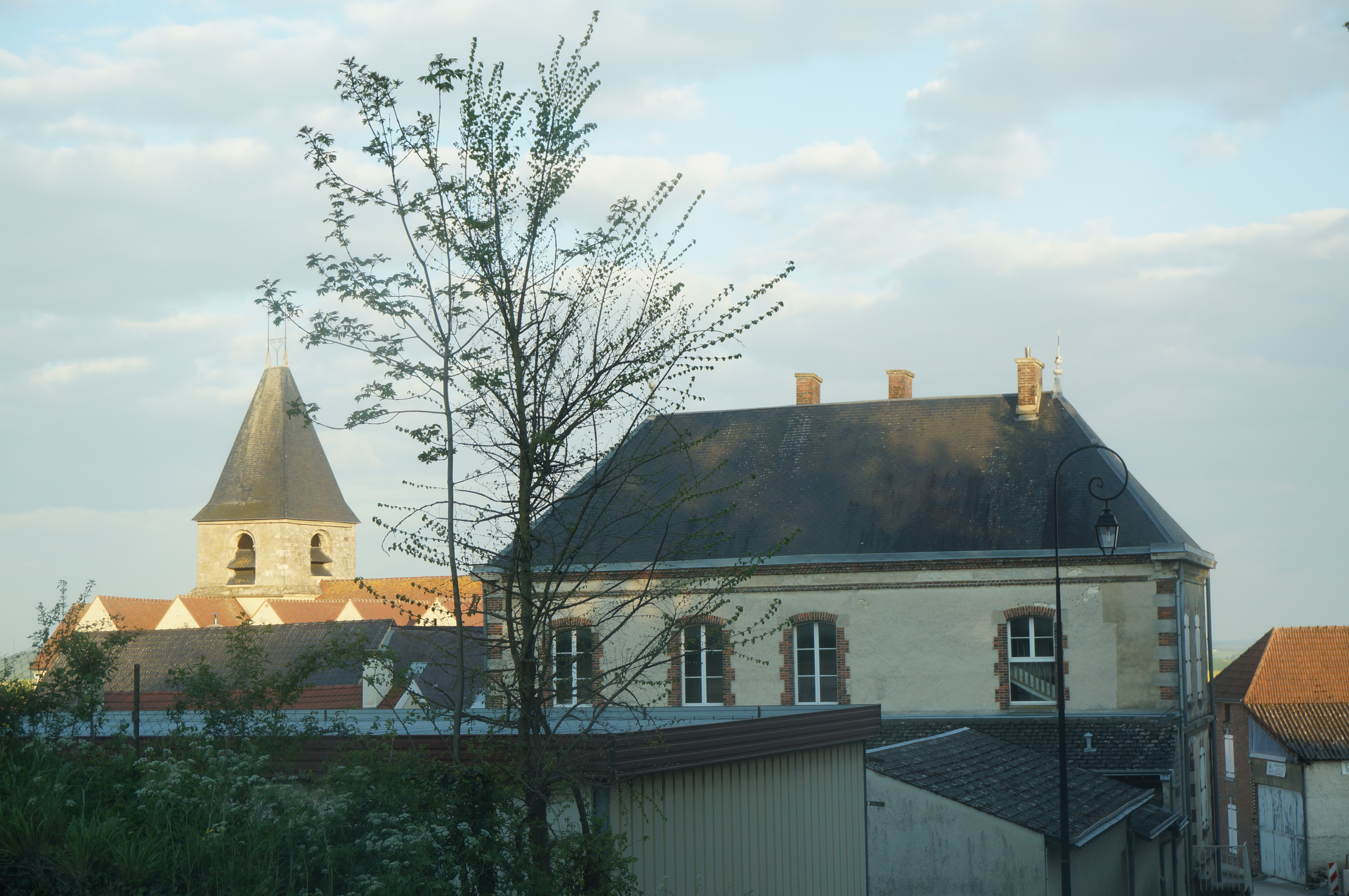
- The church and town hall in Loisy-en-Brie
- Location of Loisy-en-Brie
- Location within France Location within Grand Est
- Coordinates: 48°53′02″N 3°54′10″E
- Country: France
- Region: Grand Est
- Department: Marne
- Arrondissement: Épernay
- Canton: Vertus-Plaine Champenoise
- Intercommunality: CA Épernay, Coteaux et Plaine de Champagne

Government
  - Mayor (2020–2026): Olivier Guichon
- Area^{1}: 15.09 km^{2} (5.83 sq mi)
- Elevation: 192 m (630 ft)
- Population (2023): 171
  - Density: 11.3/km^{2} (29.3/sq mi)
- Time zone: UTC+01:00 (CET)
  - Summer (DST): UTC+02:00 (CEST)
- INSEE/Postal code: 51327 /51130
- ^{1} French Land Register data, which excludes lakes, ponds, glaciers > 1 km^{2} (0.386 sq mi or 247 acres) and river estuaries.

Loisy-en-Brie (French pronunciation: [lwazi ɑ̃ bʁi], lit. 'Loisy in Brie') is a commune in the Marne department in north-eastern France.

== See also ==
- Communes of the Marne department
