= Étréchy, Marne =

Étréchy
- Commune
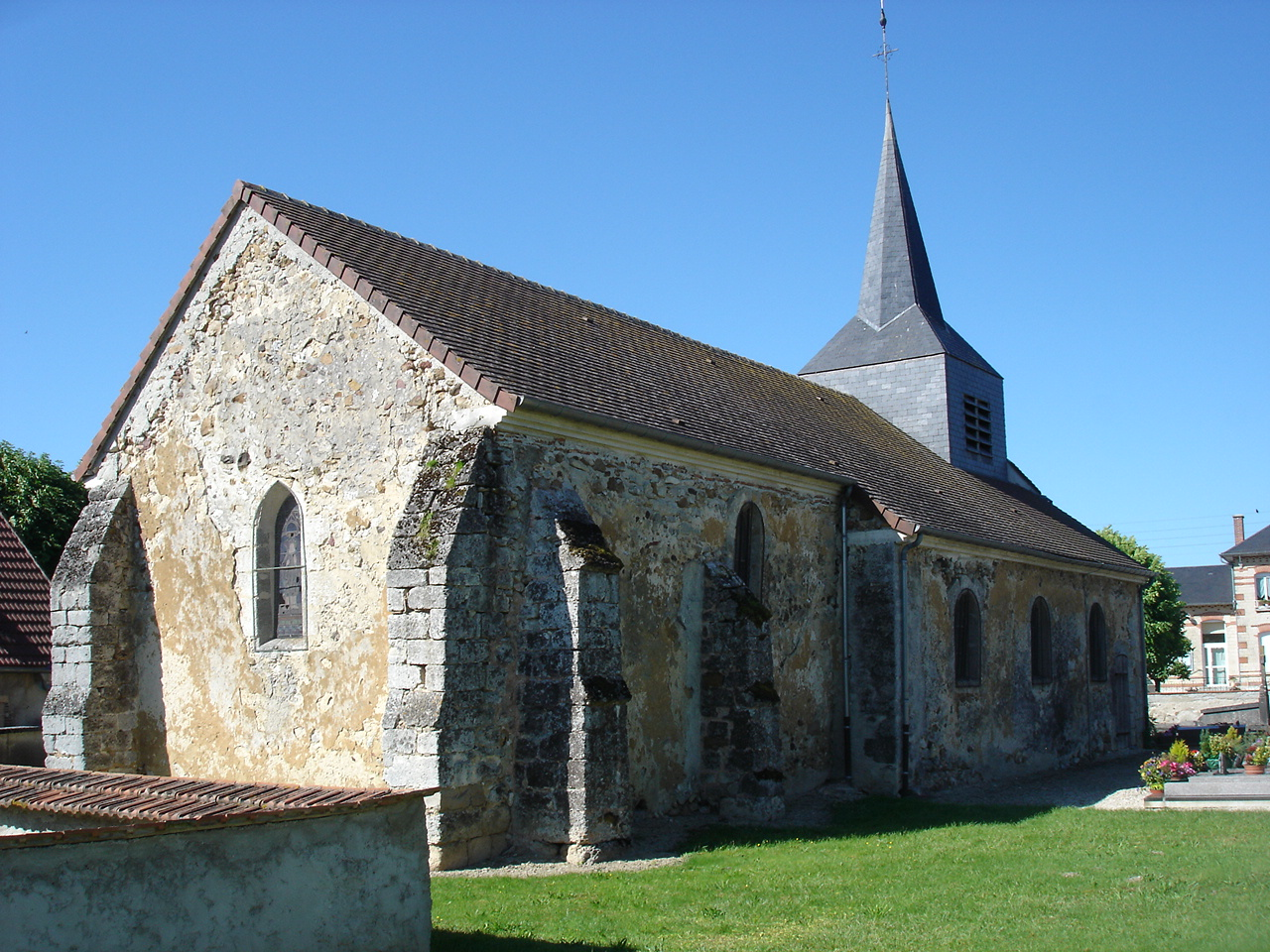
- St. Martin's Church
- Location of Étréchy
- Location within France Location within Grand Est
- Coordinates: 48°53′12″N 3°56′38″E
- Country: France
- Region: Grand Est
- Department: Marne
- Arrondissement: Épernay
- Canton: Vertus-Plaine Champenoise
- Intercommunality: CA Épernay, Coteaux et Plaine de Champagne

Government
  - Mayor (2020–2026): Monique Jannet
- Area^{1}: 6.64 km^{2} (2.56 sq mi)
- Elevation: 156 m (512 ft)
- Population (2023): 99
  - Density: 15/km^{2} (39/sq mi)
- Time zone: UTC+01:00 (CET)
  - Summer (DST): UTC+02:00 (CEST)
- INSEE/Postal code: 51239 /51130
- ^{1} French Land Register data, which excludes lakes, ponds, glaciers > 1 km^{2} (0.386 sq mi or 247 acres) and river estuaries.

Étréchy (French pronunciation: [etʁeʃi]) is a commune in the Marne department in north-eastern France.

== See also ==
- Communes of the Marne department
