= Baconnes =

- Commune
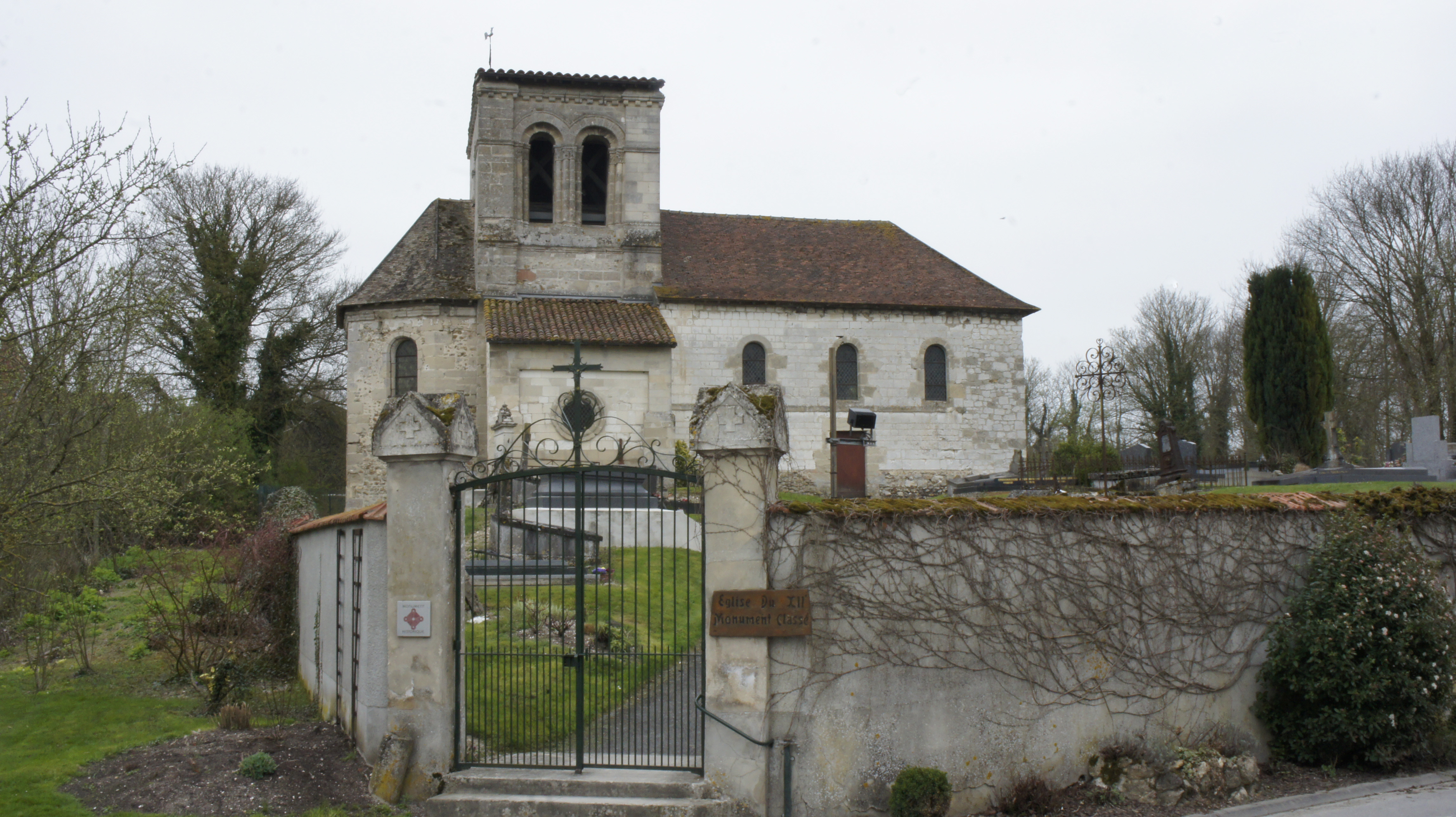
- The church in Baconnes
- Location of Baconnes
- Location within France Location within Grand Est
- Coordinates: 49°09′37″N 4°20′21″E
- Country: France
- Region: Grand Est
- Department: Marne
- Arrondissement: Châlons-en-Champagne
- Canton: Mourmelon-Vesle et Monts de Champagne
- Intercommunality: Châlons-en-Champagne

Government
  - Mayor (2020–2026): Bruno Gillet
- Area^{1}: 20.86 km^{2} (8.05 sq mi)
- Highest elevation: 166 m (545 ft)
- Lowest elevation: 111 m (364 ft)
- Population (2023): 289
  - Density: 13.9/km^{2} (35.9/sq mi)
- Time zone: UTC+01:00 (CET)
  - Summer (DST): UTC+02:00 (CEST)
- INSEE/Postal code: 51031 /51400
- ^{1} French Land Register data, which excludes lakes, ponds, glaciers > 1 km^{2} (0.386 sq mi or 247 acres) and river estuaries.

Baconnes (French pronunciation: [bakɔn]) is a commune in the Marne department in northeastern France.

== Population ==
Historical population
| Year | Pop. | ±% p.a. |
|---|---|---|
| 1968 | 160 | — |
| 1975 | 123 | −3.69% |
| 1982 | 136 | +1.45% |
| 1990 | 147 | +0.98% |
| 1999 | 170 | +1.63% |
| 2007 | 278 | +6.34% |
| 2012 | 293 | +1.06% |
| 2017 | 270 | −1.62% |
| 2023 | 289 | +1.14% |
Source: INSEE

== See also ==
- Communes of the Marne department
