= Sept-Saulx =

- Commune
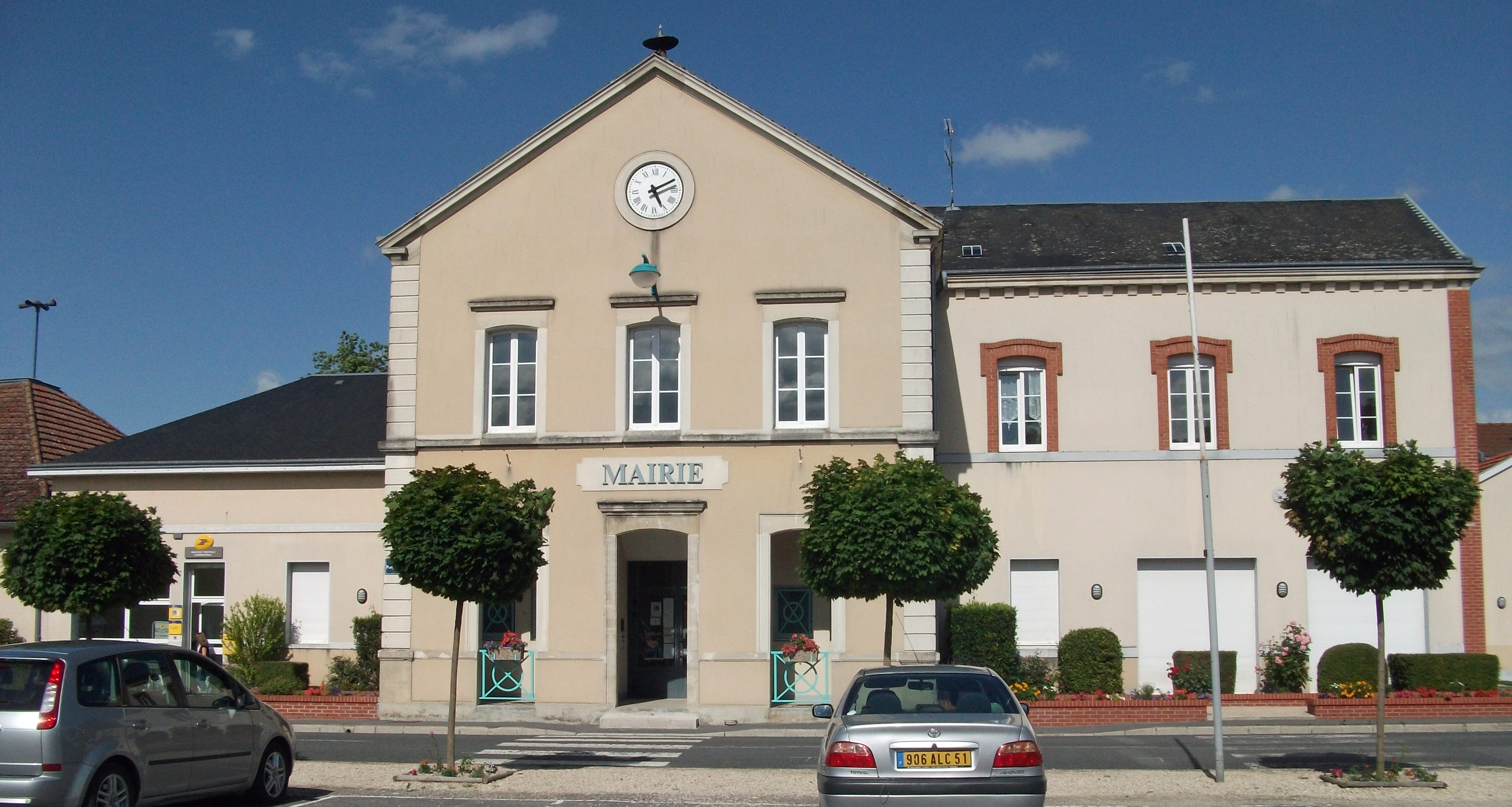
- The town hall in Sept-Saulx

- Coat of arms
- Location of Sept-Saulx
- Location within France Location within Grand Est
- Coordinates: 49°09′00″N 4°15′15″E
- Country: France
- Region: Grand Est
- Department: Marne
- Arrondissement: Reims
- Canton: Mourmelon-Vesle et Monts de Champagne
- Intercommunality: CU Grand Reims

Government
  - Mayor (2020–2026): Valérie Chaumet
- Area^{1}: 18.3 km^{2} (7.1 sq mi)
- Highest elevation: 151 m (495 ft)
- Lowest elevation: 91 m (299 ft)
- Population (2023): 691
  - Density: 37.8/km^{2} (97.8/sq mi)
- Time zone: UTC+01:00 (CET)
  - Summer (DST): UTC+02:00 (CEST)
- INSEE/Postal code: 51530 /51400
- ^{1} French Land Register data, which excludes lakes, ponds, glaciers > 1 km^{2} (0.386 sq mi or 247 acres) and river estuaries.

Sept-Saulx (French pronunciation: [sɛt so]) is a commune in the Marne department in north-eastern France.

== See also ==
- Communes of the Marne department
