= Grand Reims =

Coordinates: 49.25°N 4.03°E

- Communauté urbaine
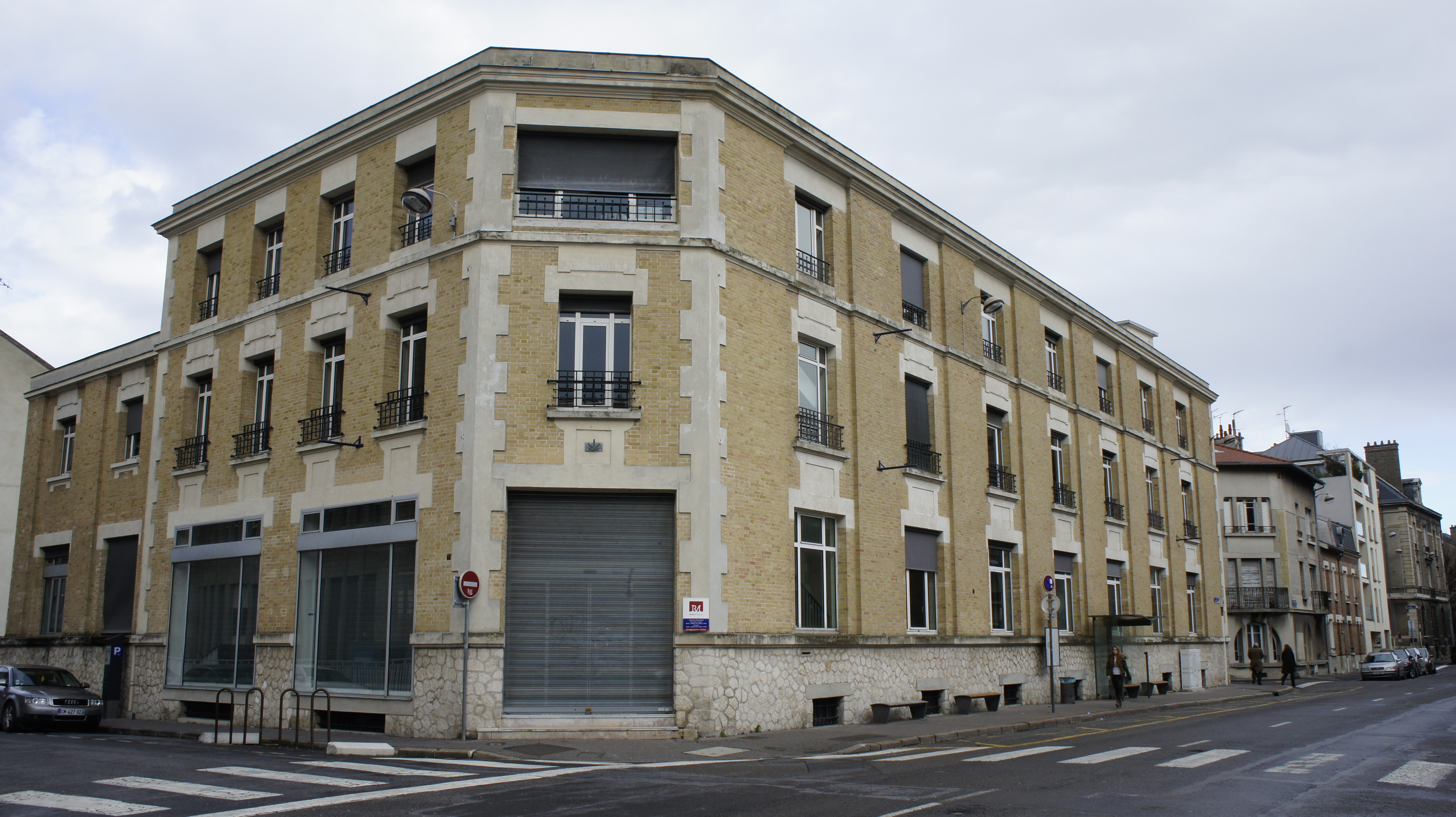

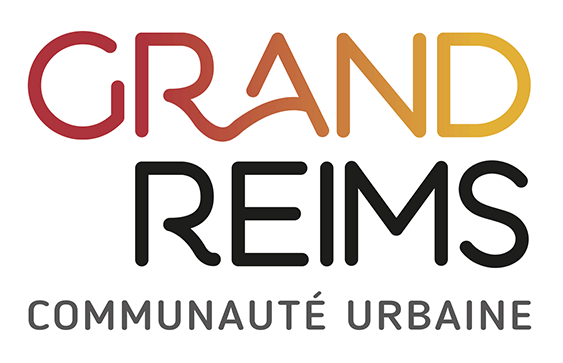
- Country: France
- Region: Grand Est
- Department: Marne
- No. of communes: {{{nbcomm}}}
- Established: 1 January 2017

Government
  - President: Catherine Vautrin (LR)
- Area: 1,432.4 km^{2} (553.1 sq mi)
- Population (2018): 295,926
  - Density: 206.59/km^{2} (535.08/sq mi)
- Website: www.grandreims.fr

The Communauté urbaine du Grand Reims is the communauté urbaine, an intercommunal structure, centred on the city of Reims. It is located in the Marne department, in the Grand Est region, northeastern France. It was created on 1 January 2017 by the merger of the previous communauté d'agglomération Reims Métropole with the communautés de communes Beine-Bourgogne, Champagne Vesle, Nord Champenois, Fismes Ardre et Vesle, Vallée de la Suippe, Rives de la Suippe, Vesle et Coteaux de la Montagne de Reims and 18 other communes. Its area is 1432.4 km^{2}. Its population was 295,926 in 2018, of which 182,211 lived in Reims proper.

== Composition ==
The communauté urbaine consists of the following 143 communes:

1. Anthenay
2. Aougny
3. Arcis-le-Ponsart
4. Aubérive
5. Aubilly
6. Auménancourt
7. Baslieux-lès-Fismes
8. Bazancourt
9. Beaumont-sur-Vesle
10. Beine-Nauroy
11. Berméricourt
12. Berru
13. Bétheniville
14. Bétheny
15. Bezannes
16. Billy-le-Grand
17. Bligny
18. Bouilly
19. Bouleuse
20. Boult-sur-Suippe
21. Bourgogne-Fresne
22. Bouvancourt
23. Branscourt
24. Breuil-sur-Vesle
25. Brimont
26. Brouillet
27. Caurel
28. Cauroy-lès-Hermonville
29. Cernay-lès-Reims
30. Châlons-sur-Vesle
31. Chambrecy
32. Chamery
33. Champfleury
34. Champigny
35. Chaumuzy
36. Chenay
37. Chigny-les-Roses
38. Cormicy
39. Cormontreuil
40. Coulommes-la-Montagne
41. Courcelles-Sapicourt
42. Courcy
43. Courlandon
44. Courmas
45. Courtagnon
46. Courville
47. Crugny
48. Cuisles
49. Dontrien
50. Écueil
51. Époye
52. Faverolles-et-Coëmy
53. Fismes
54. Germigny
55. Gueux
56. Hermonville
57. Heutrégiville
58. Hourges
59. Isles-sur-Suippe
60. Janvry
61. Jonchery-sur-Vesle
62. Jonquery
63. Jouy-lès-Reims
64. Lagery
65. Lavannes
66. Lhéry
67. Loivre
68. Ludes
69. Magneux
70. Mailly-Champagne
71. Marfaux
72. Merfy
73. Méry-Prémecy
74. Les Mesneux
75. Montbré
76. Montigny-sur-Vesle
77. Mont-sur-Courville
78. Muizon
79. Nogent-l'Abbesse
80. Olizy
81. Ormes
82. Pargny-lès-Reims
83. Les Petites-Loges
84. Pévy
85. Poilly
86. Pomacle
87. Pontfaverger-Moronvilliers
88. Pouillon
89. Pourcy
90. Prosnes
91. Prouilly
92. Prunay
93. Puisieulx
94. Reims
95. Rilly-la-Montagne
96. Romain
97. Romigny
98. Rosnay
99. Sacy
100. Saint-Brice-Courcelles
101. Saint-Étienne-sur-Suippe
102. Saint-Euphraise-et-Clairizet
103. Saint-Gilles
104. Saint-Hilaire-le-Petit
105. Saint-Léonard
106. Saint-Martin-l'Heureux
107. Saint-Masmes
108. Saint-Souplet-sur-Py
109. Saint-Thierry
110. Sarcy
111. Savigny-sur-Ardres
112. Selles
113. Sept-Saulx
114. Sermiers
115. Serzy-et-Prin
116. Sillery
117. Taissy
118. Thil
119. Thillois
120. Tinqueux
121. Tramery
122. Trépail
123. Treslon
124. Trigny
125. Trois-Puits
126. Unchair
127. Val-de-Vesle
128. Vandeuil
129. Vaudemange
130. Vaudesincourt
131. Ventelay
132. Verzenay
133. Verzy
134. Ville-Dommange
135. Ville-en-Selve
136. Ville-en-Tardenois
137. Villers-Allerand
138. Villers-aux-Nœuds
139. Villers-Franqueux
140. Villers-Marmery
141. Vrigny
142. Warmeriville
143. Witry-lès-Reims

== Administration ==
The communauté urbaine is led by an indirectly elected President along with a bureau communautaire composed of 15 Vice-Presidents and 44 additional elected members.

=== President ===
List of presidents of the communauté urbaine
In office		Name	Party	Capacity	Ref.
1 January 2017	present	Catherine Vautrin	LR	Government Minister (2004-2007) Deputy for the 2nd constituency of the Marne (2002-2017) Deputy Mayor of Reims (2014-present) Former-President of the Communauté d'agglomération de Reims (2014-2016)	

=== Elected members ===
The Communauté urbaine du Grand Reims is governed by an elected council composed of 206 councillors from each of the 143 communes in Grand Reims. The number of council seats each commune receives is proportional based upon their population as follows:

- 59 delegates for Reims
- 3 delegates for Tinqueux
- 2 delegates for each of Bétheny, Bourgogne-Fresne and Cormicy
- 1 delegate for each of the remaining 138 communes

=== Administrative seat ===
The administrative seat of the communauté urbaine is located in Reims at 3 Rue Eugène-Desteuque.
