= Dontrien =

- Commune
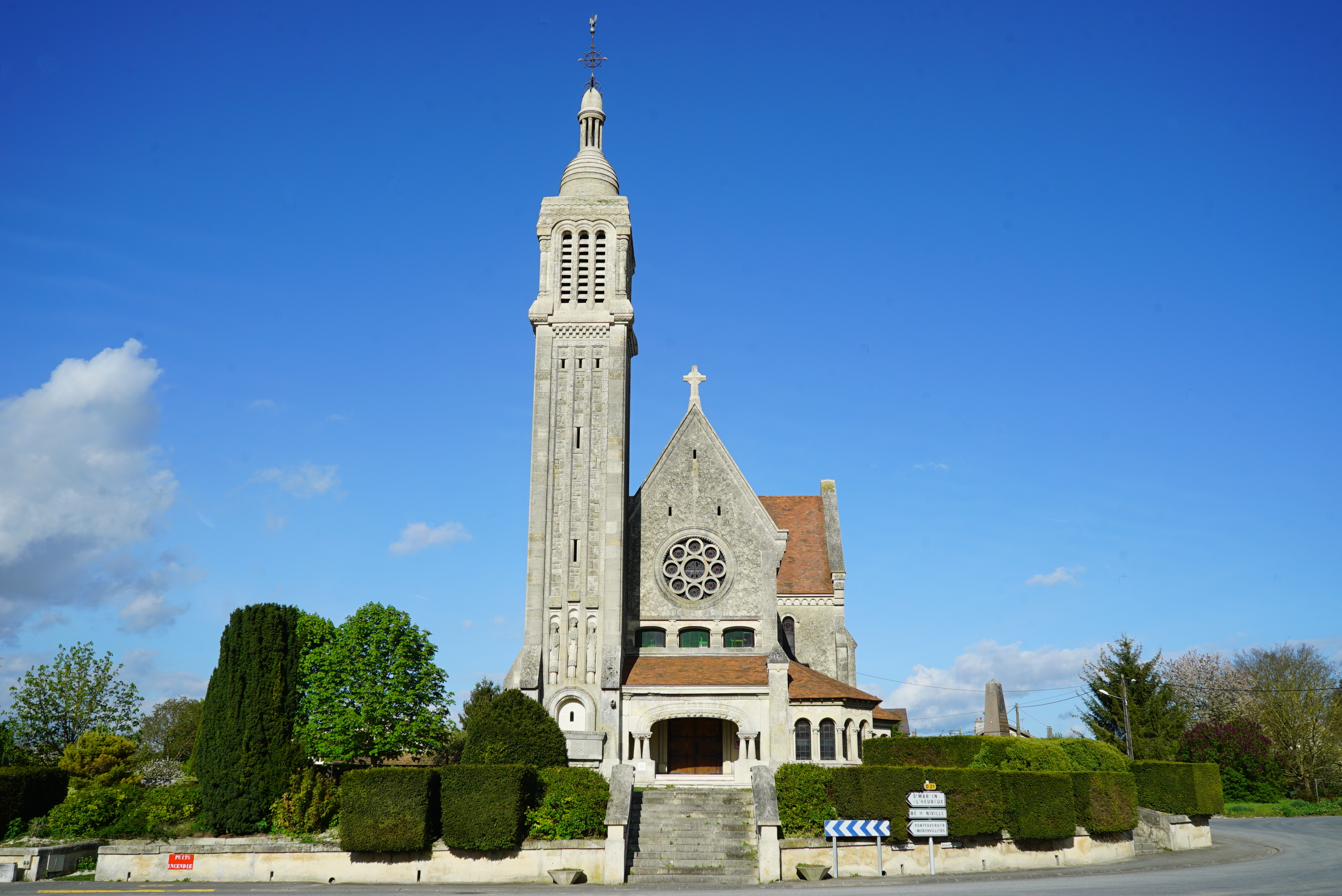
- The church in Dontrien
- Location of Dontrien
- Location within France Location within Grand Est
- Coordinates: 49°14′24″N 4°24′47″E
- Country: France
- Region: Grand Est
- Department: Marne
- Arrondissement: Reims
- Canton: Mourmelon-Vesle et Monts de Champagne
- Intercommunality: CU Grand Reims

Government
  - Mayor (2020–2026): Philippe Chardonnet
- Area^{1}: 12.66 km^{2} (4.89 sq mi)
- Elevation: 107 m (351 ft)
- Population (2023): 261
  - Density: 20.6/km^{2} (53.4/sq mi)
- Time zone: UTC+01:00 (CET)
  - Summer (DST): UTC+02:00 (CEST)
- INSEE/Postal code: 51216 /51490
- ^{1} French Land Register data, which excludes lakes, ponds, glaciers > 1 km^{2} (0.386 sq mi or 247 acres) and river estuaries.

Dontrien (French pronunciation: [dɔ̃tʁijɛ̃]) is a commune in the Marne department in north-eastern France.

== Geography ==
Dontrien is a small village in the north of the Marne department, about 35 km from Reims and 40 km from Châlons-en-Champagne.

On its territory, Dontrien has two rivers, Suippe and Py, which are full of fish. Since the 1970s, Baloré, a small beach on the Suippe has been successful.

== History ==
There are different possible origins for the name, such as "don de rien" ("gift of nothing"), i.e. a gift given during the Middle Ages from a Lord to one of his vassals at a time when Dontrien was a forest with no land suitable for cultivation.

In 1247, there was an outbreak of leprosy.

In 1905, 955 hectares were used by farmers and 300 hectares for forest. The village comprised 325 people with 107 citizens in 109 houses. Of these 107 people there were 21 firemen, 1 station master, 3 wardens, 1 brewery, 1 bakery, 1 café, 12 farmers and 1 nurse.

== Sport ==
Every 2 weeks, FC.Dontrien plays at the village stadium. In 2008, the team rose to the second division with 29 victories and 1 tie.

== Personalities ==
Émile Zola briefly mentioned Dontrien in his novel La Débâcle, set around the time of the Franco-Prussian War:

"Finally, around four o'clock, the 106th stopped at Dontrien, a village built on the banks of the Suippe. The little river ran among clusters of trees; the old church was in the middle of the cemetery, which a huge chestnut tree covered completely in its shadow. And it was on the left bank, in a sloping meadow, that the regiment had pitched its tents. The officers said that the four army corps were bivouacking along the course of the Suippe that evening, from Auberive to Heutrégiville, passing by Dontrien, Béthiniville and Pont-Faverger, a march of some five leagues [20 km]."

== See also ==
- Communes of the Marne department
