= Tramery =

- Commune
- Location of Tramery
- Location within France Location within Grand Est
- Coordinates: 49°13′30″N 3°48′19″E
- Country: France
- Region: Grand Est
- Department: Marne
- Arrondissement: Reims
- Canton: Dormans-Paysages de Champagne
- Intercommunality: CU Grand Reims

Government
  - Mayor (2020–2026): Marie-Bernadette Neyrinck
- Area^{1}: 3.56 km^{2} (1.37 sq mi)
- Elevation: 82 m (269 ft)
- Population (2023): 149
  - Density: 41.9/km^{2} (108/sq mi)
- Time zone: UTC+01:00 (CET)
  - Summer (DST): UTC+02:00 (CEST)
- INSEE/Postal code: 51577 /51170
- ^{1} French Land Register data, which excludes lakes, ponds, glaciers > 1 km^{2} (0.386 sq mi or 247 acres) and river estuaries.

Tramery (French pronunciation: [tʁamʁi]) is a commune in the Marne department in north-eastern France.

== See also ==
- Communes of the Marne department
