= Ville-en-Selve =

- Commune
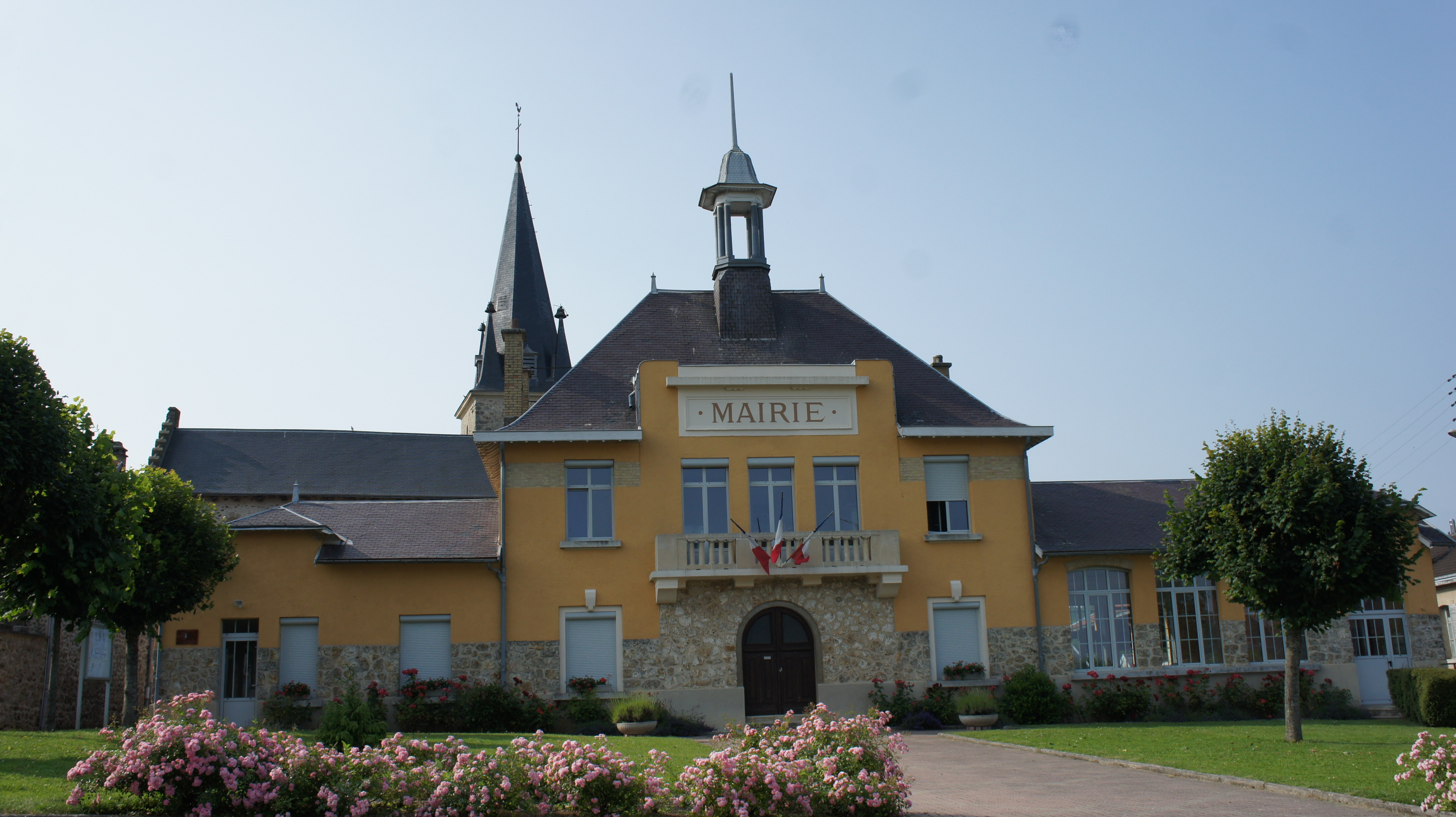
- The town hall in Ville-en-Selve
- Location of Ville-en-Selve
- Location within France Location within Grand Est
- Coordinates: 49°07′37″N 4°04′55″E
- Country: France
- Region: Grand Est
- Department: Marne
- Arrondissement: Reims
- Canton: Mourmelon-Vesle et Monts de Champagne
- Intercommunality: CU Grand Reims

Government
  - Mayor (2020–2026): Gilles Dessoye
- Area^{1}: 8.84 km^{2} (3.41 sq mi)
- Elevation: 233 m (764 ft)
- Population (2023): 296
  - Density: 33.5/km^{2} (86.7/sq mi)
- Time zone: UTC+01:00 (CET)
  - Summer (DST): UTC+02:00 (CEST)
- INSEE/Postal code: 51623 /51500
- ^{1} French Land Register data, which excludes lakes, ponds, glaciers > 1 km^{2} (0.386 sq mi or 247 acres) and river estuaries.

Ville-en-Selve (French pronunciation: [vil ɑ̃ sɛlv]) is a commune in the Marne department in north-eastern France.

== See also ==
- Communes of the Marne department
- Montagne de Reims Regional Natural Park
