= Vaudemange =

- Commune
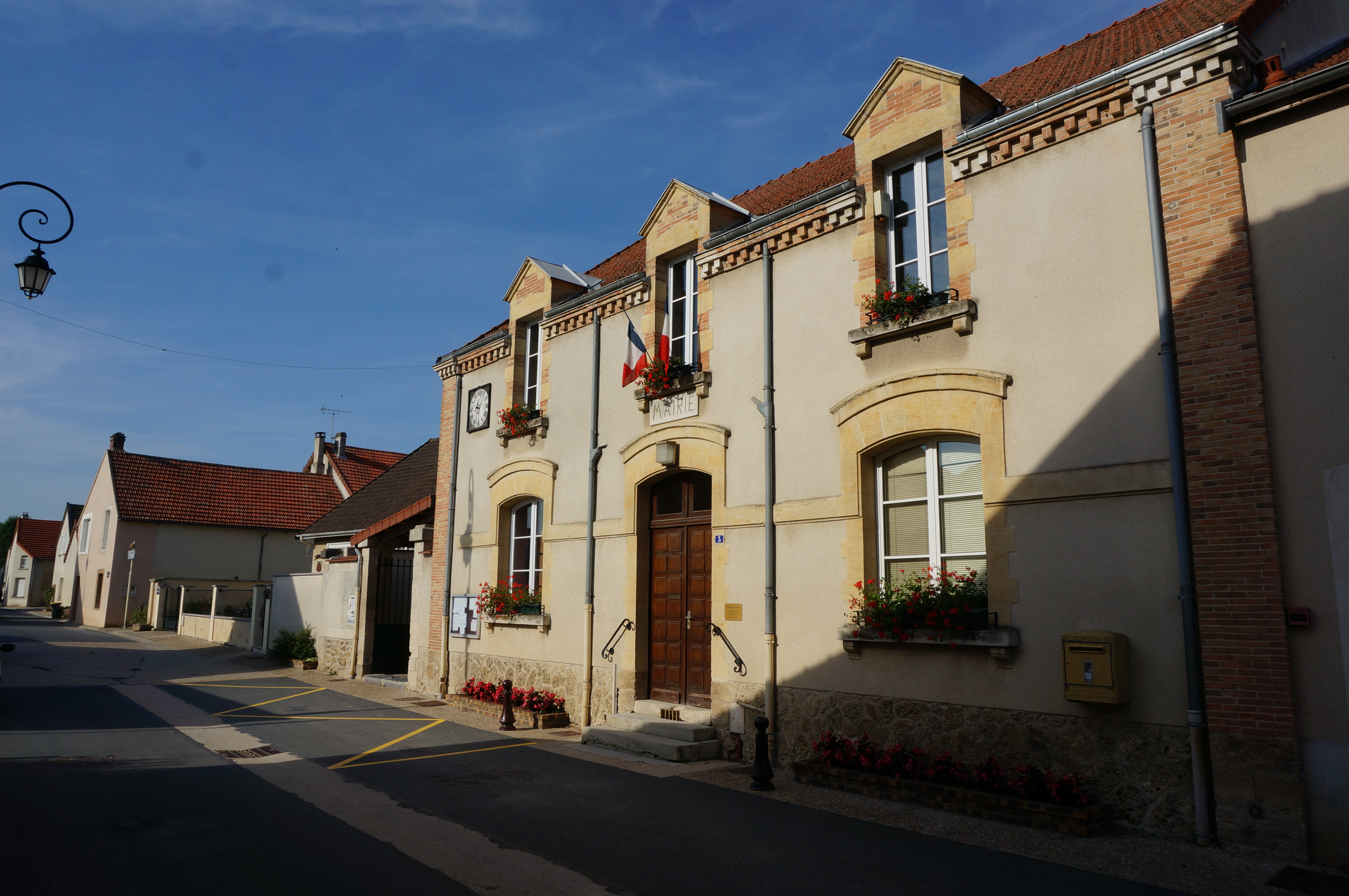
- The town hall in Vaudemange
- Location of Vaudemange
- Location within France Location within Grand Est
- Coordinates: 49°05′34″N 4°13′32″E
- Country: France
- Region: Grand Est
- Department: Marne
- Arrondissement: Reims
- Canton: Mourmelon-Vesle et Monts de Champagne
- Intercommunality: CU Grand Reims

Government
  - Mayor (2020–2026): Conrad Cher
- Area^{1}: 13.12 km^{2} (5.07 sq mi)
- Elevation: 100 m (330 ft)
- Population (2023): 333
  - Density: 25.4/km^{2} (65.7/sq mi)
- Time zone: UTC+01:00 (CET)
  - Summer (DST): UTC+02:00 (CEST)
- INSEE/Postal code: 51599 /51380
- ^{1} French Land Register data, which excludes lakes, ponds, glaciers > 1 km^{2} (0.386 sq mi or 247 acres) and river estuaries.

Vaudemange (French pronunciation: [vodmɑ̃ʒ], before 1999: Vaudemanges) is a commune in the Marne department in north-eastern France.

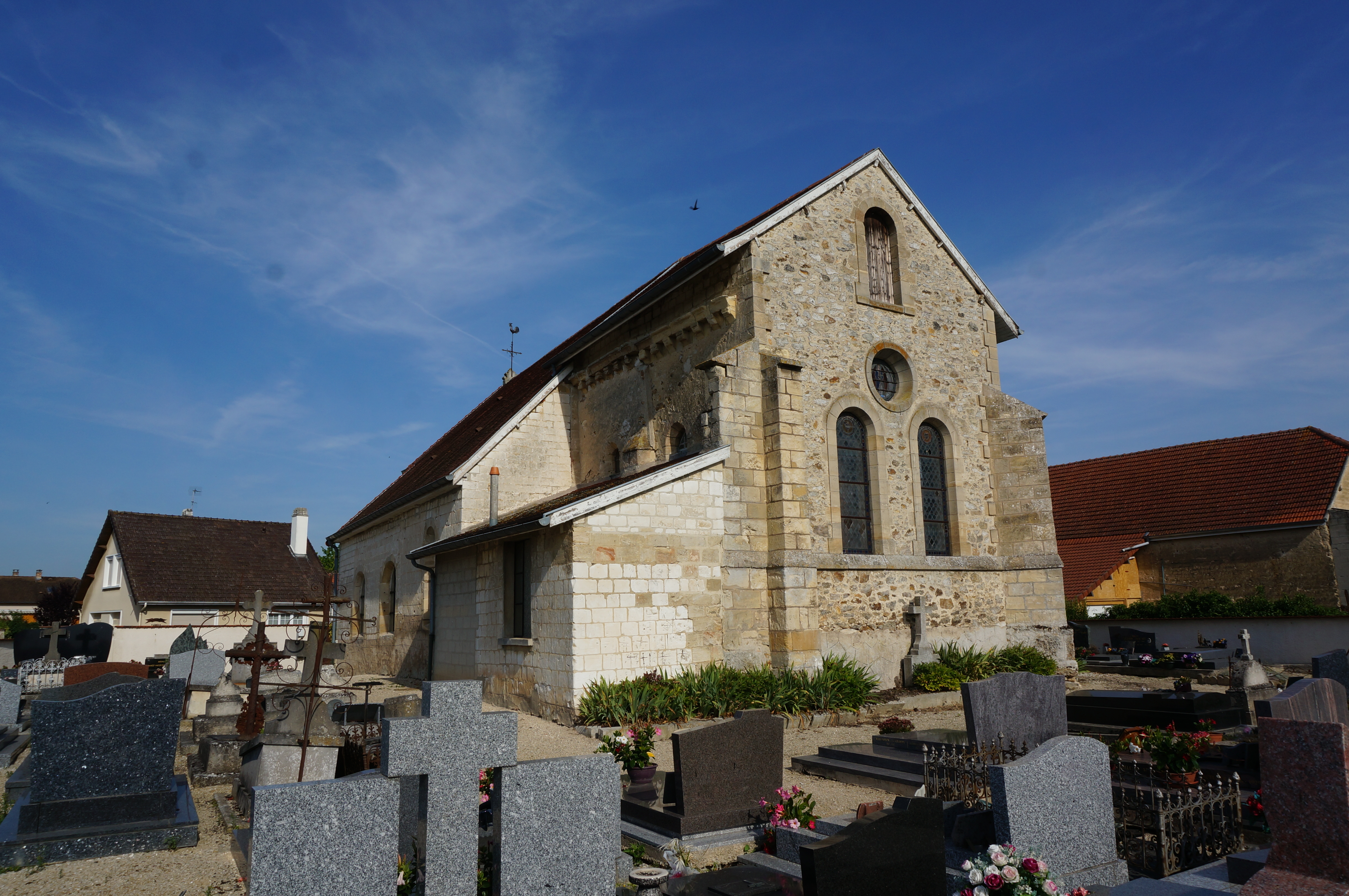
Church

== See also ==
- Communes of the Marne department
