= Treslon =

- Commune
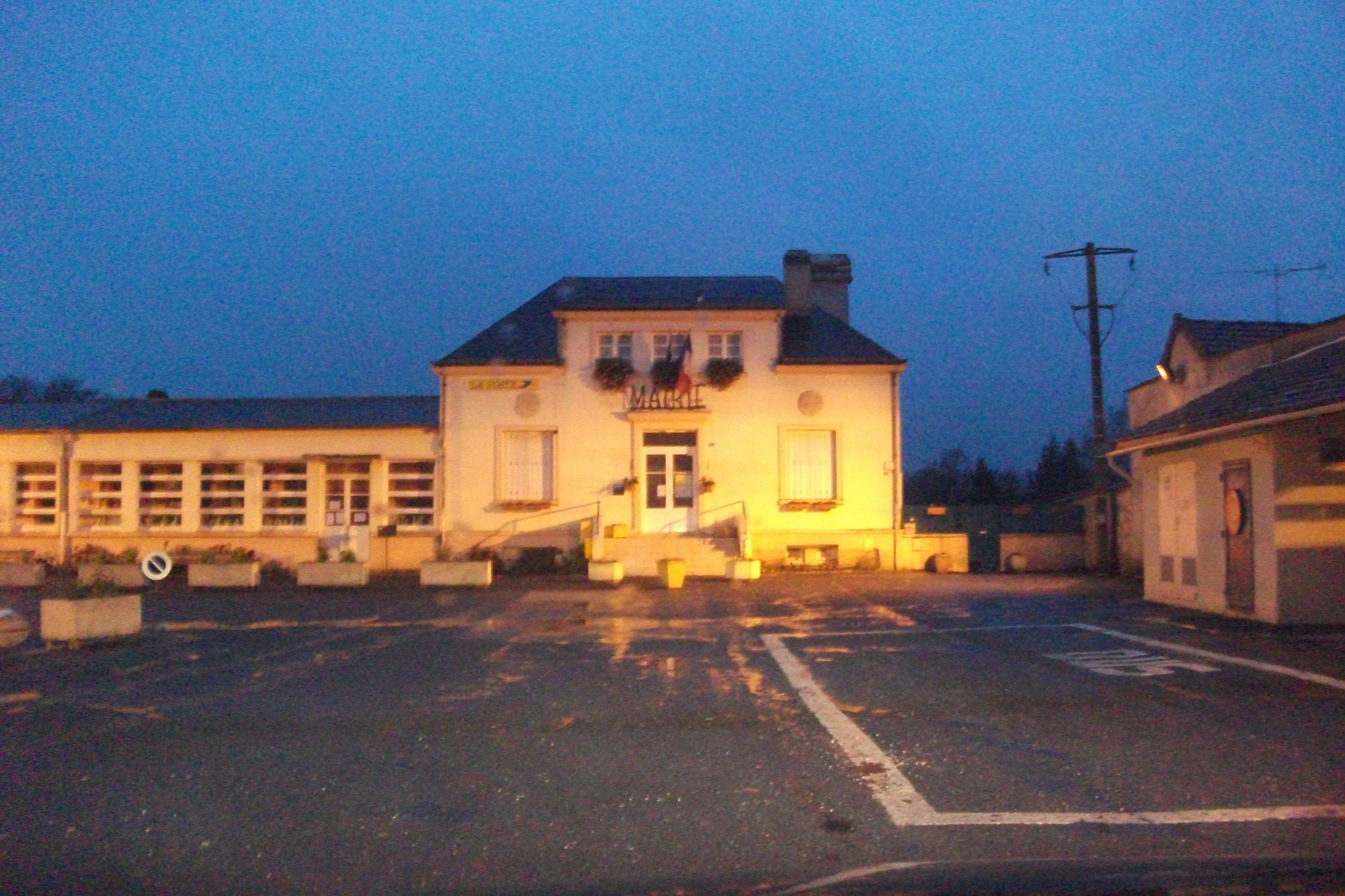
- The town hall in Treslon
- Location of Treslon
- Location within France Location within Grand Est
- Coordinates: 49°14′28″N 3°49′23″E
- Country: France
- Region: Grand Est
- Department: Marne
- Arrondissement: Reims
- Canton: Fismes-Montagne de Reims
- Intercommunality: CU Grand Reims

Government
  - Mayor (2020–2026): Stéphane Gombaud
- Area^{1}: 3.97 km^{2} (1.53 sq mi)
- Elevation: 170 m (560 ft)
- Population (2023): 252
  - Density: 63.5/km^{2} (164/sq mi)
- Time zone: UTC+01:00 (CET)
  - Summer (DST): UTC+02:00 (CEST)
- INSEE/Postal code: 51581 /51140
- ^{1} French Land Register data, which excludes lakes, ponds, glaciers > 1 km^{2} (0.386 sq mi or 247 acres) and river estuaries.

Treslon (French pronunciation: [tʁɛlɔ̃]) is a commune in the Marne department in north-eastern France.

== See also ==
- Communes of the Marne department
