= Livry-Louvercy =

- Commune
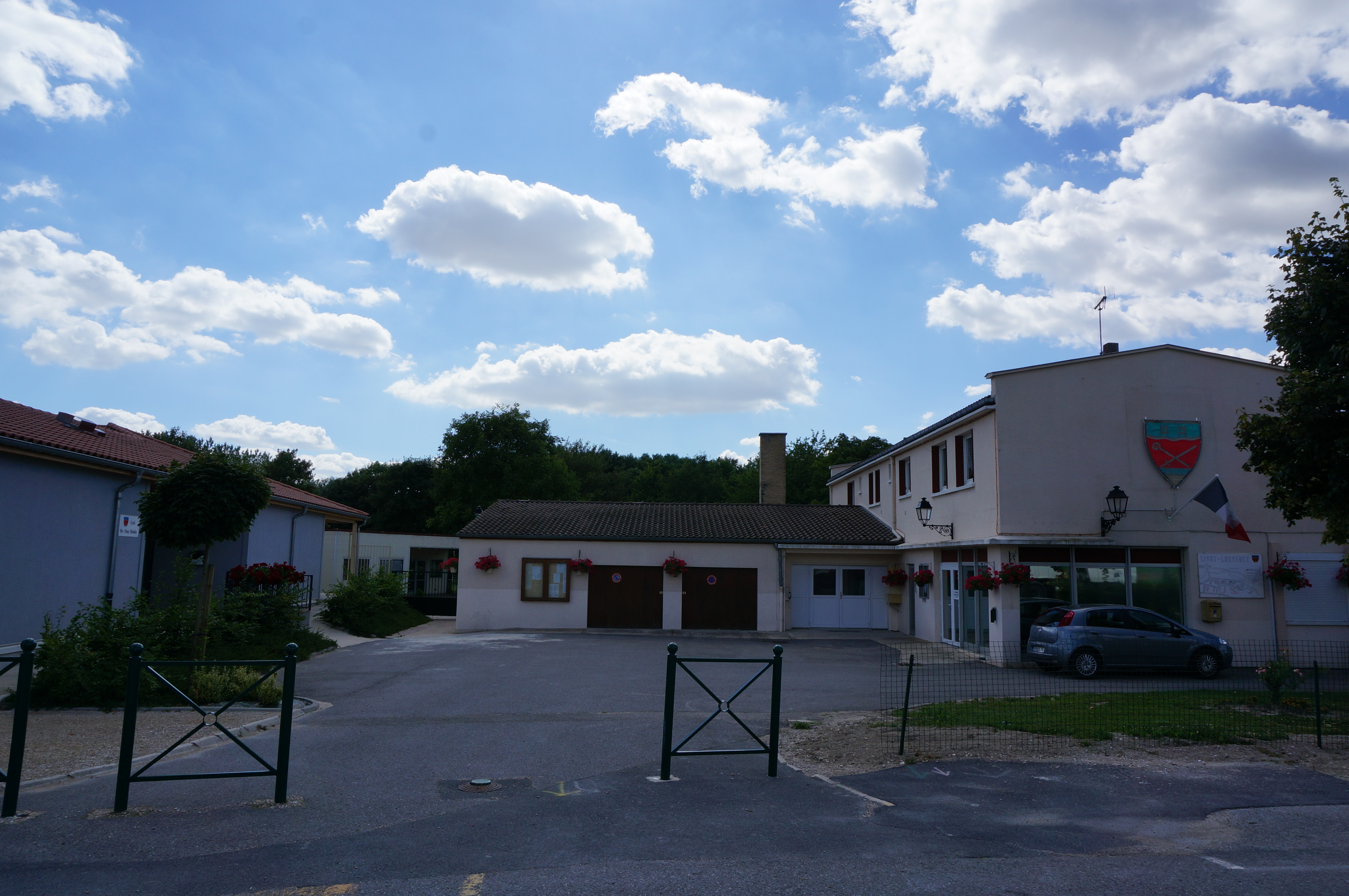
- The town hall and school in Livry-Louvercy

- Coat of arms
- Location of Livry-Louvercy
- Location within France Location within Grand Est
- Coordinates: 49°06′51″N 4°18′28″E
- Country: France
- Region: Grand Est
- Department: Marne
- Arrondissement: Châlons-en-Champagne
- Canton: Mourmelon-Vesle et Monts de Champagne
- Intercommunality: CA Châlons-en-Champagne

Government
  - Mayor (2020–2026): Pascal Marchand
- Area^{1}: 30.74 km^{2} (11.87 sq mi)
- Elevation: 102 m (335 ft)
- Highest elevation: 140 m (460 ft)
- Lowest elevation: 96 m (315 ft)
- Population (2023): 1,074
  - Density: 34.94/km^{2} (90.49/sq mi)
- Time zone: UTC+01:00 (CET)
  - Summer (DST): UTC+02:00 (CEST)
- INSEE/Postal code: 51326 /51400
- ^{1} French Land Register data, which excludes lakes, ponds, glaciers > 1 km^{2} (0.386 sq mi or 247 acres) and river estuaries.

Livry-Louvercy (French pronunciation: [livʁi luvɛʁsi]) is a commune in the Marne department in north-eastern France.

== See also ==
- Communes of the Marne department
