= Trois-Puits =

- Commune
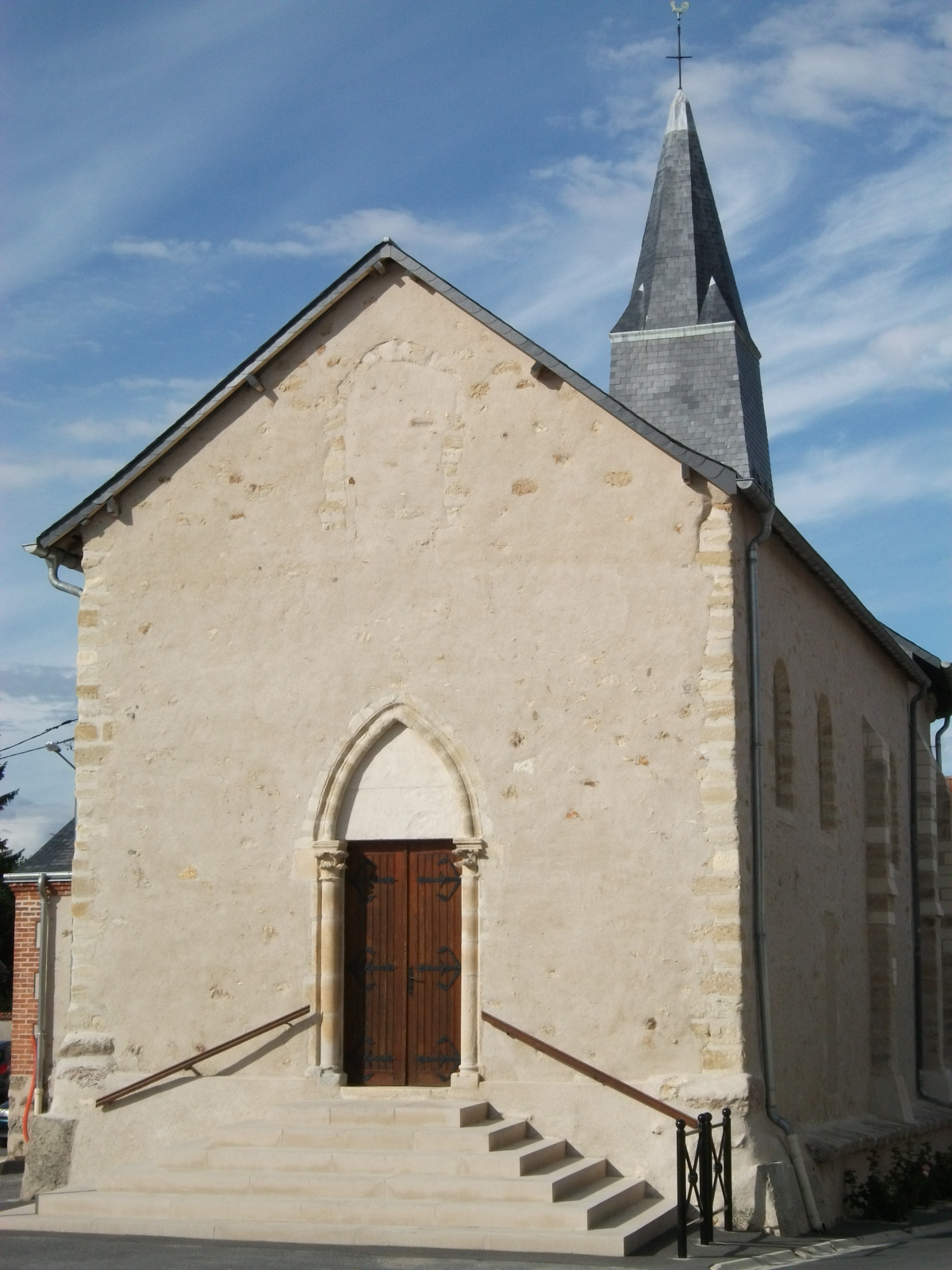
- Saint Stephen church
- Location of Trois-Puits
- Location within France Location within Grand Est
- Coordinates: 49°12′25″N 4°02′25″E
- Country: France
- Region: Grand Est
- Department: Marne
- Arrondissement: Reims
- Canton: Reims-8
- Intercommunality: CU Grand Reims

Government
  - Mayor (2020–2026): Dominique Henin
- Area^{1}: 2.14 km^{2} (0.83 sq mi)
- Highest elevation: 142 m (466 ft)
- Lowest elevation: 91 m (299 ft)
- Population (2023): 167
  - Density: 78.0/km^{2} (202/sq mi)
- Time zone: UTC+01:00 (CET)
  - Summer (DST): UTC+02:00 (CEST)
- INSEE/Postal code: 51584 /51500
- ^{1} French Land Register data, which excludes lakes, ponds, glaciers > 1 km^{2} (0.386 sq mi or 247 acres) and river estuaries.

Trois-Puits (French pronunciation: [tʁwɑ pɥi]) is a commune in the Marne department in north-eastern France.

== See also ==
- Communes of the Marne department
