= Unchair =

- Commune
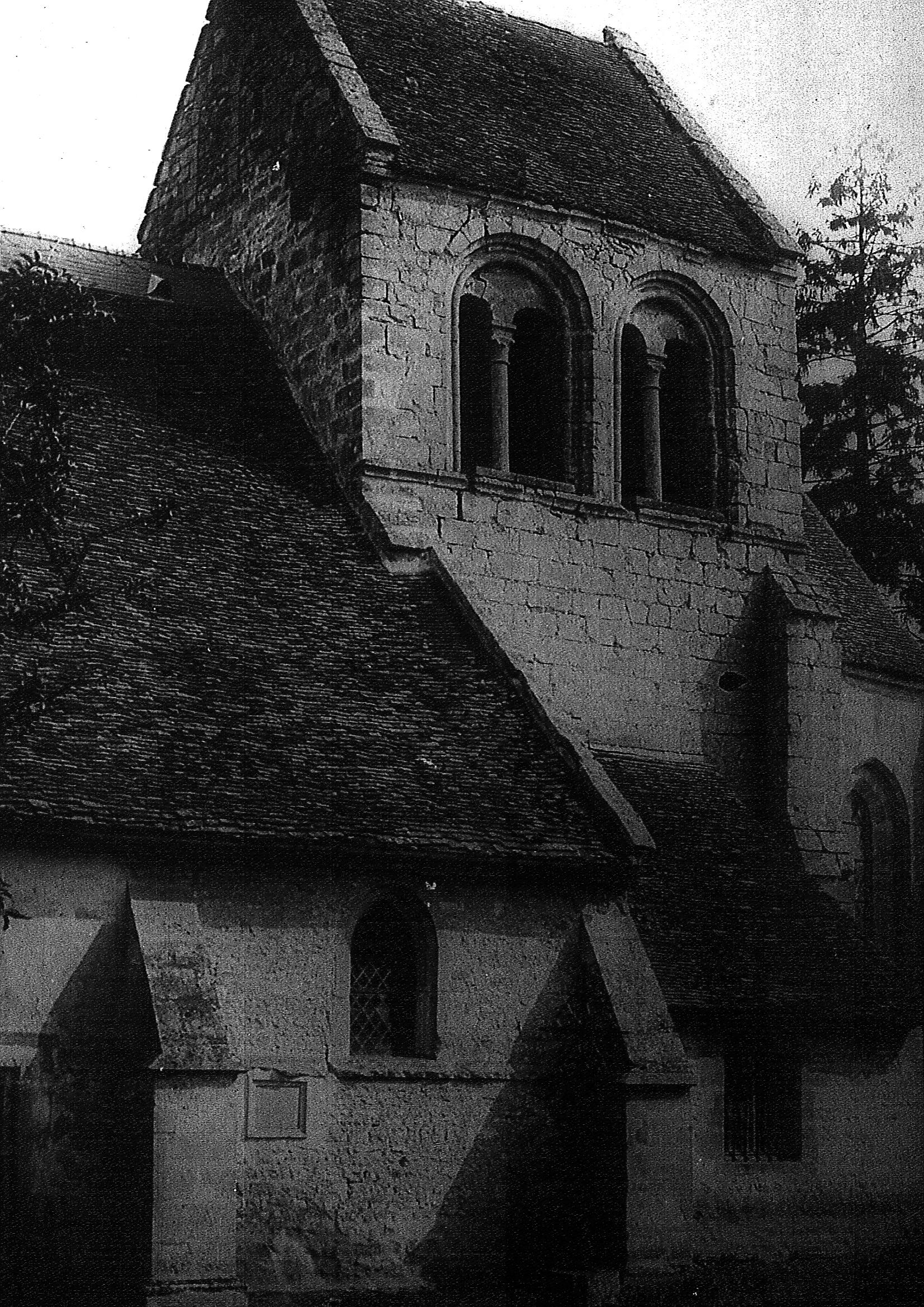
- The church in Unchair
- Location of Unchair
- Location within France Location within Grand Est
- Coordinates: 49°17′28″N 3°44′54″E
- Country: France
- Region: Grand Est
- Department: Marne
- Arrondissement: Reims
- Canton: Fismes-Montagne de Reims
- Intercommunality: CU Grand Reims

Government
  - Mayor (2020–2026): Marcel Bencivengo
- Area^{1}: 3.73 km^{2} (1.44 sq mi)
- Elevation: 75 m (246 ft)
- Population (2023): 194
  - Density: 52.0/km^{2} (135/sq mi)
- Time zone: UTC+01:00 (CET)
  - Summer (DST): UTC+02:00 (CEST)
- INSEE/Postal code: 51586 /51170
- ^{1} French Land Register data, which excludes lakes, ponds, glaciers > 1 km^{2} (0.386 sq mi or 247 acres) and river estuaries.

Unchair (French pronunciation: [œ̃ʃɛʁ]) is a commune in the Marne department in north-eastern France.

== See also ==
- Communes of the Marne department
