= Ludes =

- Commune
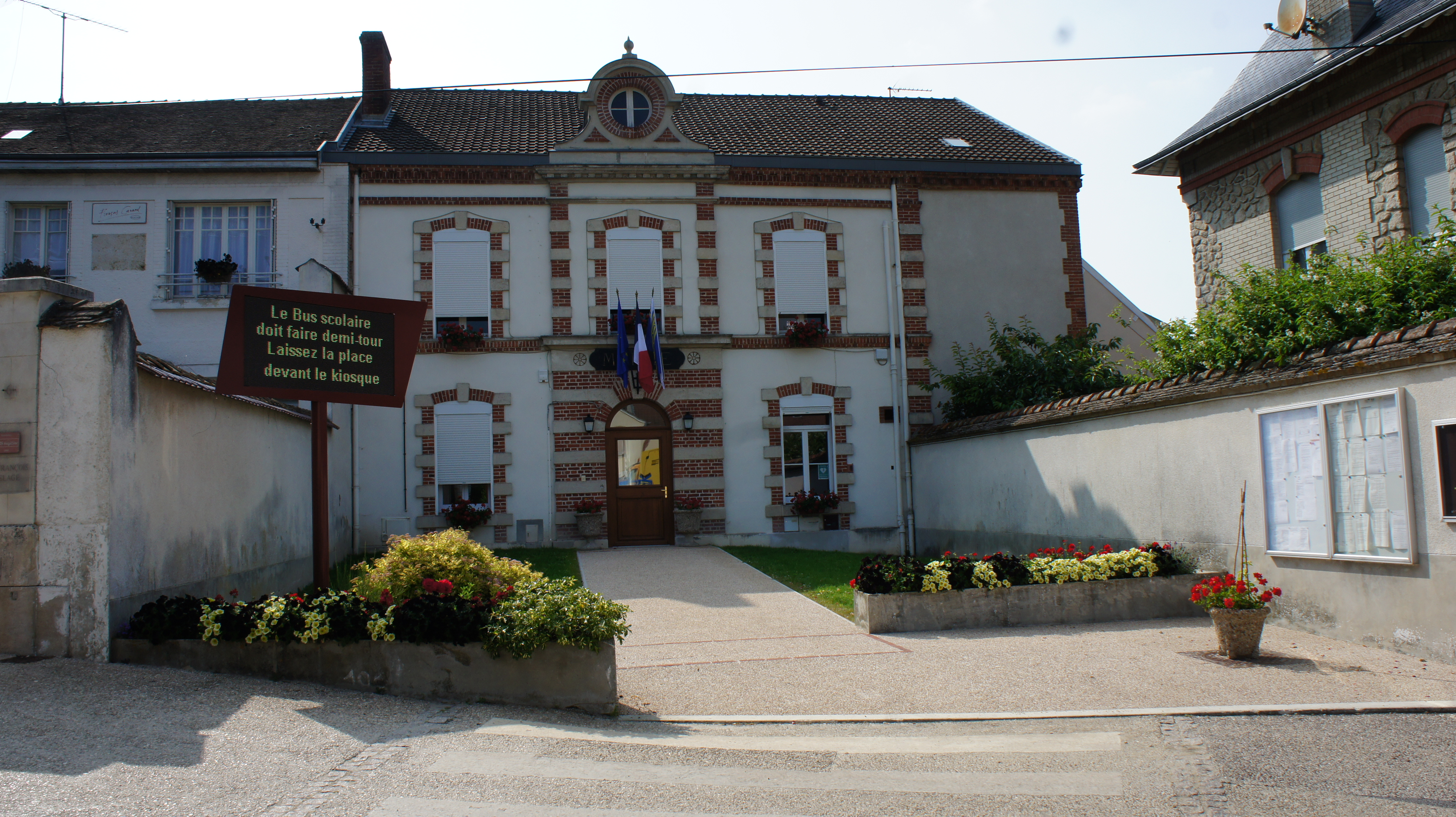
- The town hall in Ludes

- Coat of arms
- Location of Ludes
- Location within France Location within Grand Est
- Coordinates: 49°09′19″N 4°04′47″E
- Country: France
- Region: Grand Est
- Department: Marne
- Arrondissement: Reims
- Canton: Mourmelon-Vesle et Monts de Champagne
- Intercommunality: CU Grand Reims

Government
  - Mayor (2022–2026): Jean-Pierre Jorez
- Area^{1}: 12.22 km^{2} (4.72 sq mi)
- Highest elevation: 279 m (915 ft)
- Lowest elevation: 93 m (305 ft)
- Population (2023): 687
  - Density: 56.2/km^{2} (146/sq mi)
- Time zone: UTC+01:00 (CET)
  - Summer (DST): UTC+02:00 (CEST)
- INSEE/Postal code: 51333 /51500
- ^{1} French Land Register data, which excludes lakes, ponds, glaciers > 1 km^{2} (0.386 sq mi or 247 acres) and river estuaries.

Ludes (French pronunciation: [lyd]) is a commune in the Marne department in north-eastern France. As of 2017, its population is 640.

== See also ==
- Communes of the Marne department
- Montagne de Reims Regional Natural Park
