= Montbré =

- Commune
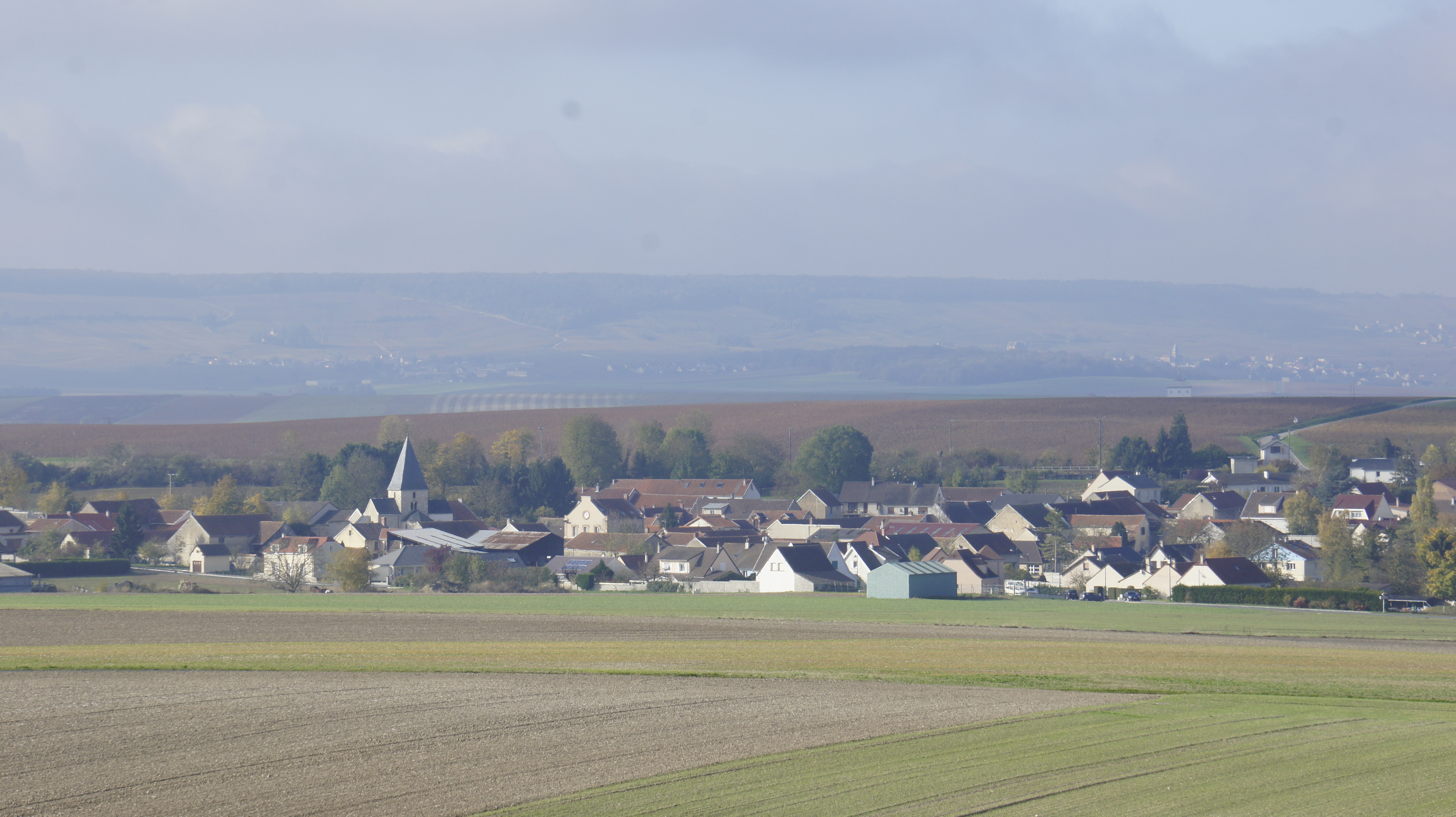
- Location of Montbré
- Location within France Location within Grand Est
- Coordinates: 49°11′37″N 4°02′32″E
- Country: France
- Region: Grand Est
- Department: Marne
- Arrondissement: Reims
- Canton: Mourmelon-Vesle et Monts de Champagne
- Intercommunality: CU Grand Reims

Government
  - Mayor (2020–2026): Maryse Lequeux
- Area^{1}: 3.08 km^{2} (1.19 sq mi)
- Highest elevation: 165 m (541 ft)
- Lowest elevation: 103 m (338 ft)
- Population (2023): 398
  - Density: 129/km^{2} (335/sq mi)
- Time zone: UTC+01:00 (CET)
  - Summer (DST): UTC+02:00 (CEST)
- INSEE/Postal code: 51375 /51500
- ^{1} French Land Register data, which excludes lakes, ponds, glaciers > 1 km^{2} (0.386 sq mi or 247 acres) and river estuaries.

Montbré (French pronunciation: [mɔ̃bʁe]) is a commune in the Marne department in north-eastern France. The area of the commune of Montbré is 3.08 km^{2}, and its elevation range lies between 103 and 165 m.

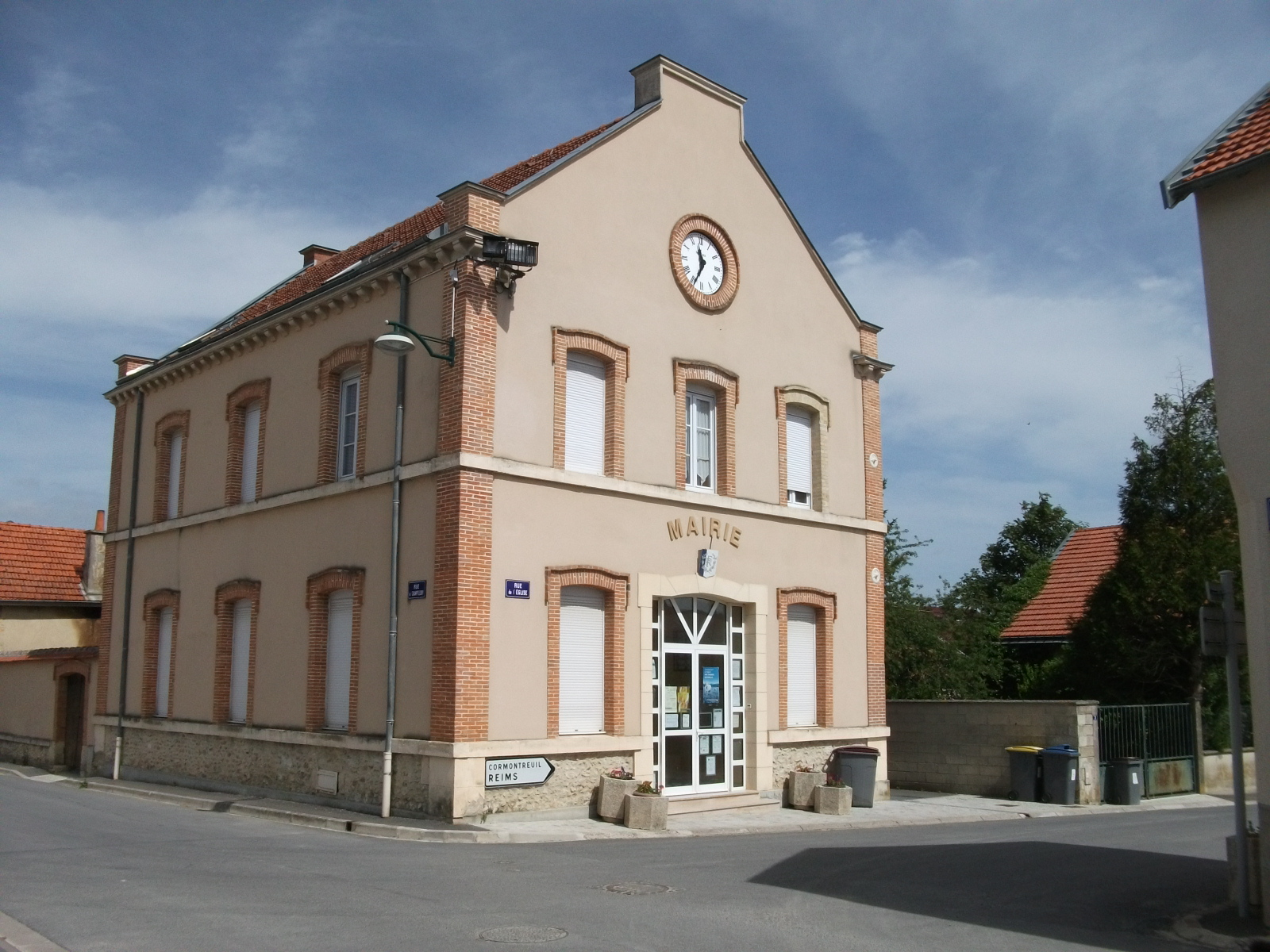
The town hall in Montbré

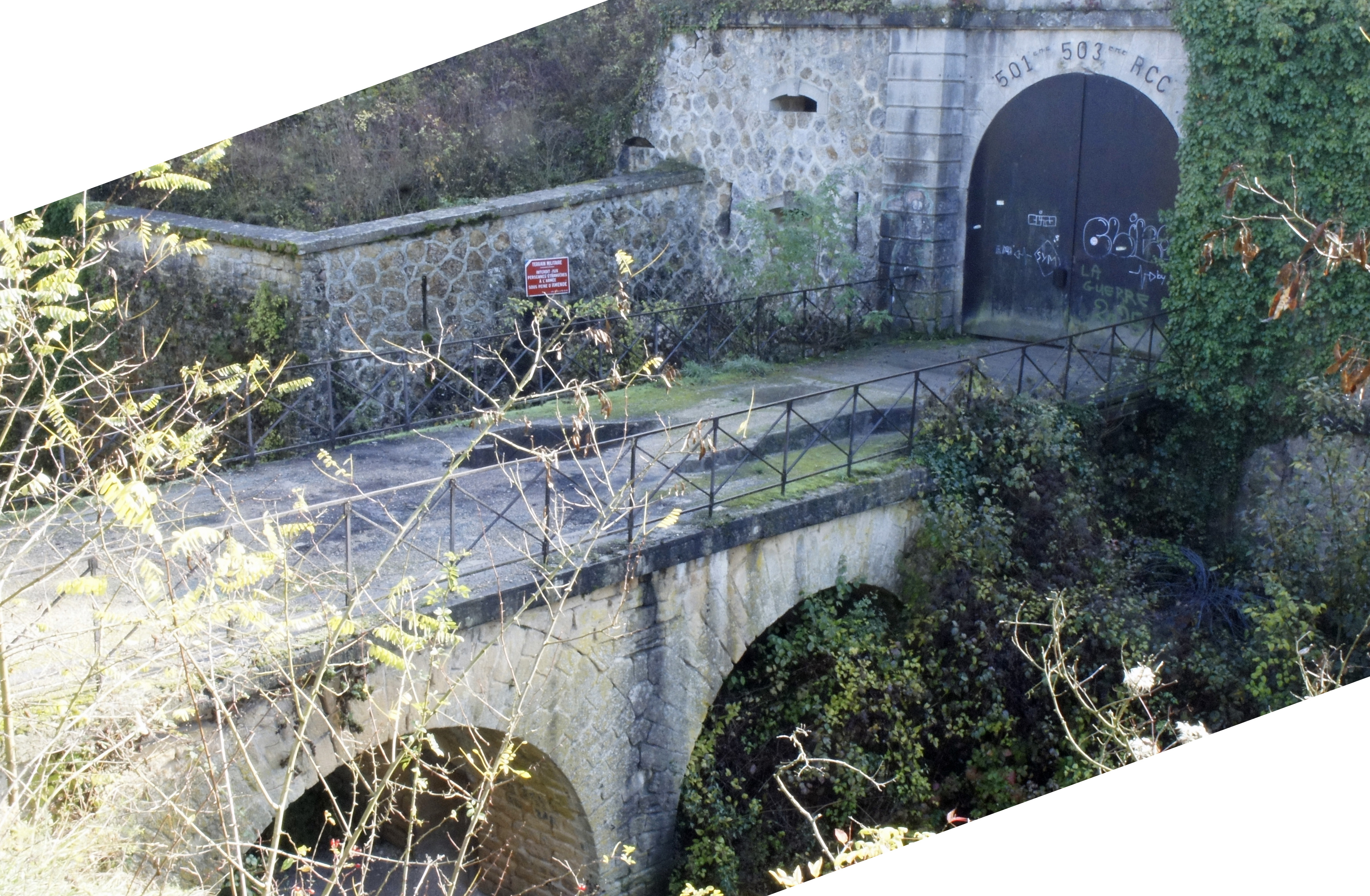
Serré-de-Rivière, fortification

== See also ==
- Communes of the Marne department
