= Val-de-Vesle =

- Commune
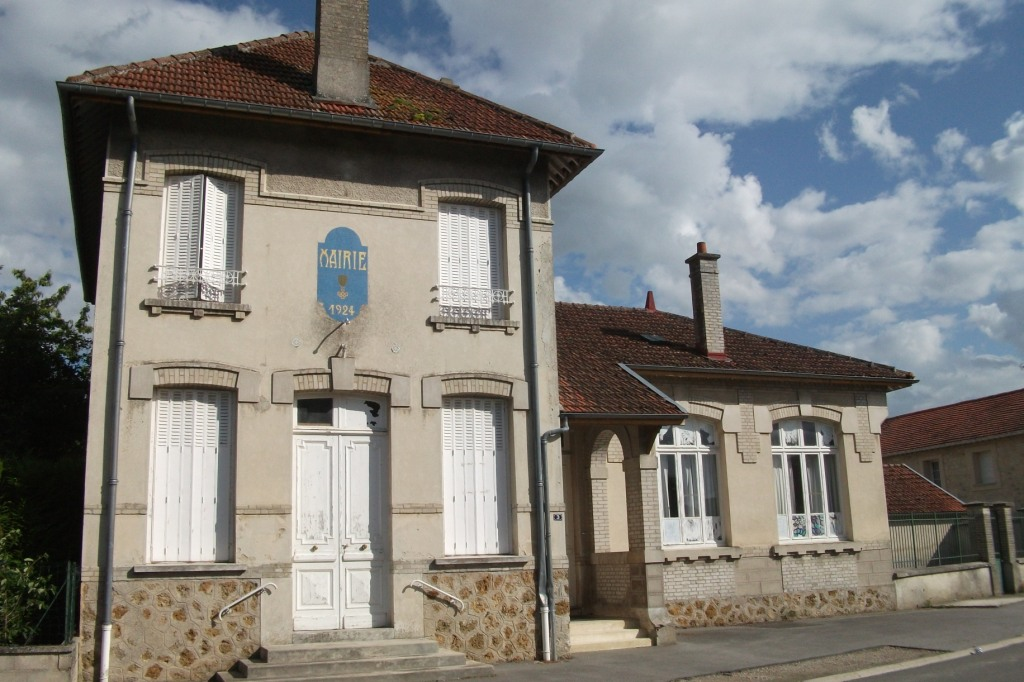
- The town hall in Val-de-Vesle

- Coat of arms
- Location of Val-de-Vesle
- Location within France Location within Grand Est
- Coordinates: 49°10′32″N 4°13′23″E
- Country: France
- Region: Grand Est
- Department: Marne
- Arrondissement: Reims
- Canton: Mourmelon-Vesle et Monts de Champagne
- Intercommunality: CU Grand Reims

Government
  - Mayor (2020–2026): Serge Hiet
- Area^{1}: 37.15 km^{2} (14.34 sq mi)
- Highest elevation: 158 m (518 ft)
- Lowest elevation: 87 m (285 ft)
- Population (2023): 1,019
  - Density: 27.43/km^{2} (71.04/sq mi)
- Time zone: UTC+01:00 (CET)
  - Summer (DST): UTC+02:00 (CEST)
- INSEE/Postal code: 51571 /51360
- ^{1} French Land Register data, which excludes lakes, ponds, glaciers > 1 km^{2} (0.386 sq mi or 247 acres) and river estuaries.

Val-de-Vesle (French pronunciation: [val də vɛl]; lit. 'Vale of Vesle') is a commune in the Marne department in the Grand Est region in northeastern France.

== History ==
The Val-de-Vesle commune was created in 1965 with the merger of the former communes of Courmelois, Thuisy and Wez.

== See also ==
- Communes of the Marne department
