= Saint-Souplet-sur-Py =

- Commune
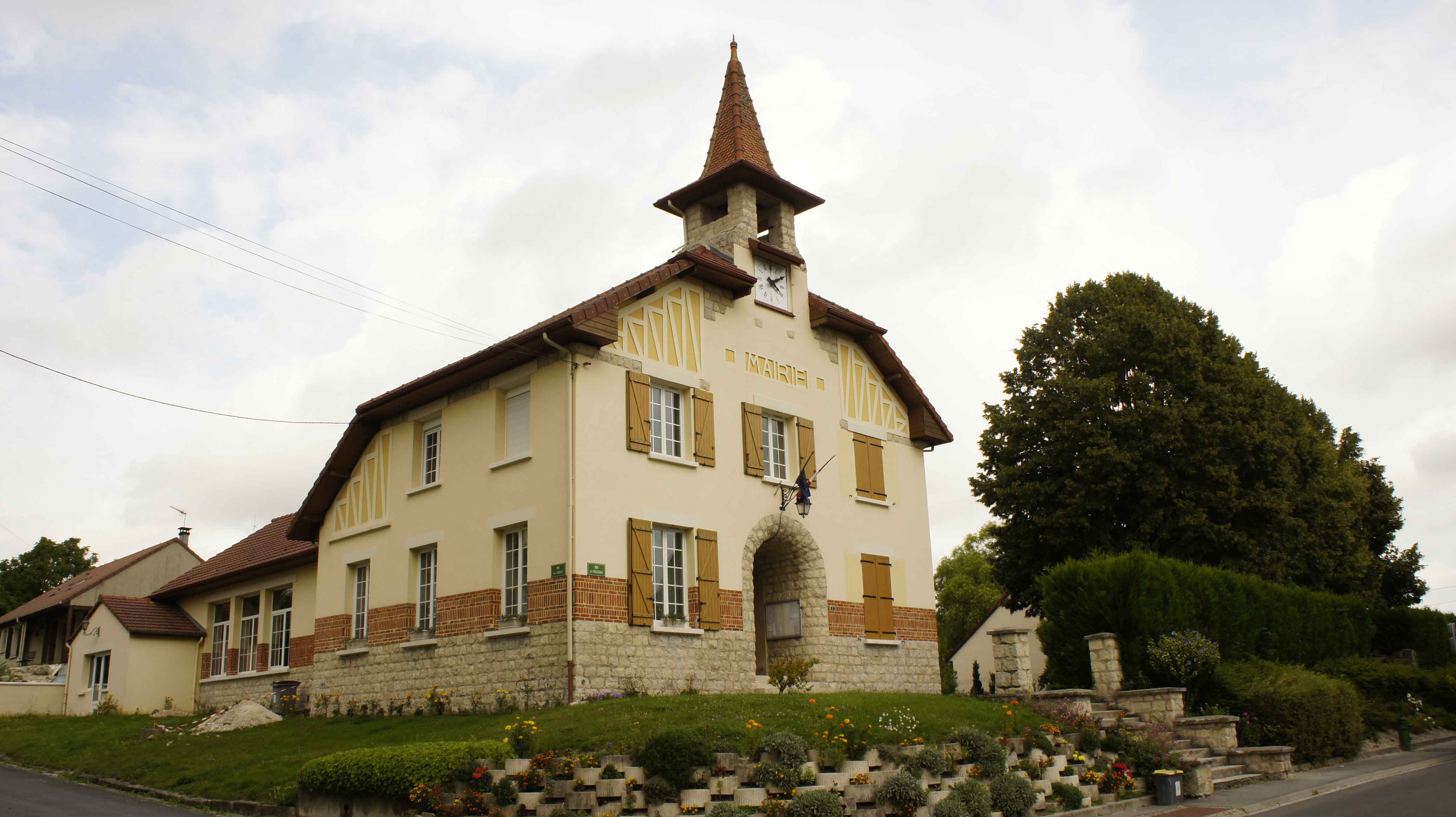
- The town hall in Saint-Souplet-sur-Py
- Location of Saint-Souplet-sur-Py
- Location within France Location within Grand Est
- Coordinates: 49°14′14″N 4°27′58″E
- Country: France
- Region: Grand Est
- Department: Marne
- Arrondissement: Reims
- Canton: Mourmelon-Vesle et Monts de Champagne
- Intercommunality: CU Grand Reims

Government
  - Mayor (2020–2026): Jean-Christophe Poins
- Area^{1}: 21.2 km^{2} (8.2 sq mi)
- Elevation: 121 m (397 ft)
- Population (2023): 134
  - Density: 6.32/km^{2} (16.4/sq mi)
- Time zone: UTC+01:00 (CET)
  - Summer (DST): UTC+02:00 (CEST)
- INSEE/Postal code: 51517 /51600
- ^{1} French Land Register data, which excludes lakes, ponds, glaciers > 1 km^{2} (0.386 sq mi or 247 acres) and river estuaries.

Saint-Souplet-sur-Py (French pronunciation: [sɛ̃ suplɛ syʁ pi]) is a commune in the Marne department in north-eastern France.

== See also ==
- Communes of the Marne department
