= Époye =

- Commune
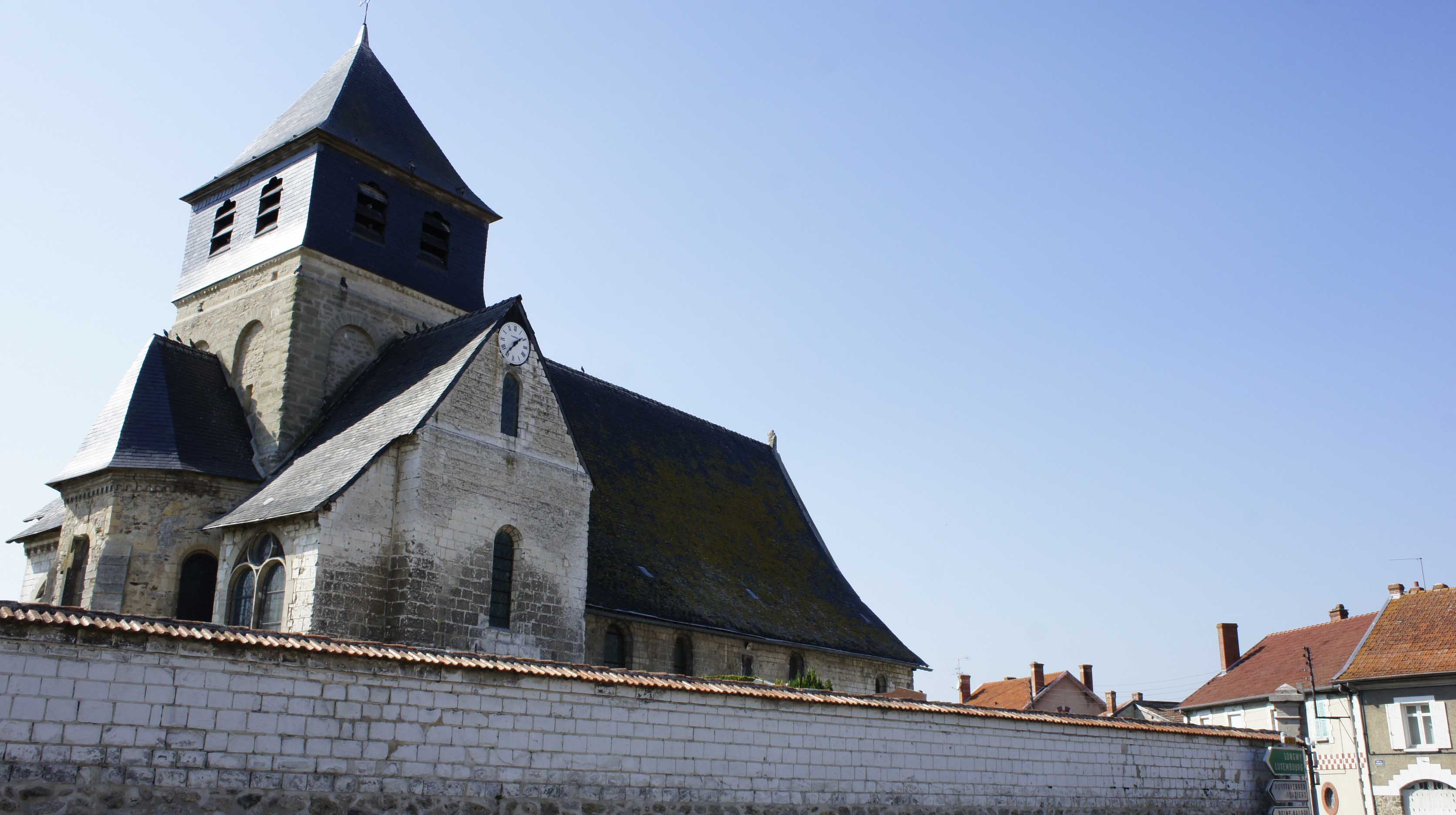
- The church in Époye
- Location of Époye
- Location within France Location within Grand Est
- Coordinates: 49°17′26″N 4°14′23″E
- Country: France
- Region: Grand Est
- Department: Marne
- Arrondissement: Reims
- Canton: Mourmelon-Vesle et Monts de Champagne
- Intercommunality: CU Grand Reims

Government
  - Mayor (2020–2026): Laurence Garus
- Area^{1}: 15.35 km^{2} (5.93 sq mi)
- Elevation: 97 m (318 ft)
- Population (2023): 416
  - Density: 27.1/km^{2} (70.2/sq mi)
- Time zone: UTC+01:00 (CET)
  - Summer (DST): UTC+02:00 (CEST)
- INSEE/Postal code: 51232 /51490
- ^{1} French Land Register data, which excludes lakes, ponds, glaciers > 1 km^{2} (0.386 sq mi or 247 acres) and river estuaries.

Époye (French pronunciation: [epwa]) is a commune in the Marne department in north-eastern France.

== See also ==
- Communes of the Marne department
