= Les Petites-Loges =

Petites-Loges
- Commune
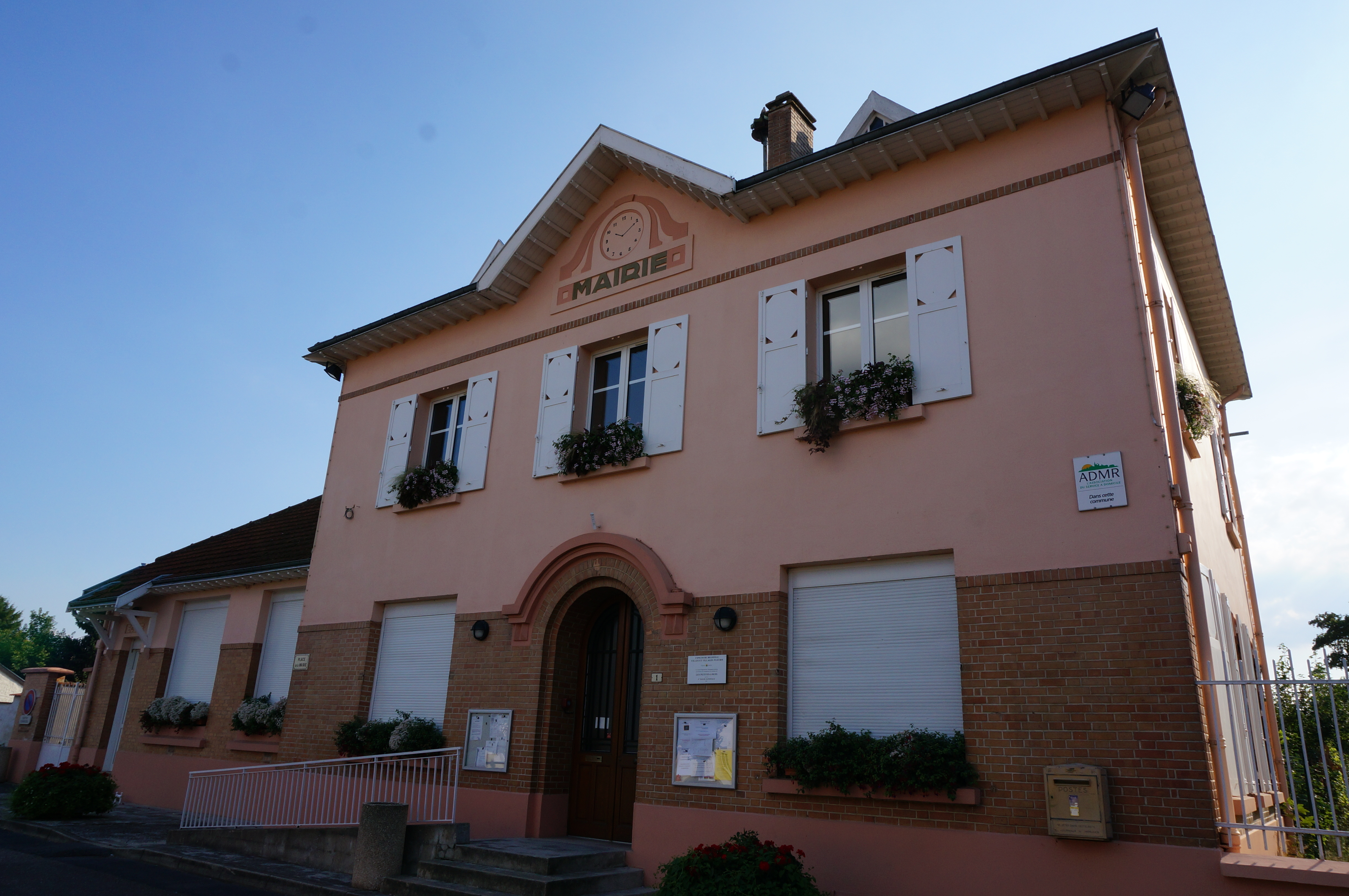
- The town hall in Les Petites-Loges
- Location of Petites-Loges
- Location within France Location within Grand Est
- Coordinates: 49°08′19″N 4°13′43″E
- Country: France
- Region: Grand Est
- Department: Marne
- Arrondissement: Reims
- Canton: Mourmelon-Vesle et Monts de Champagne
- Intercommunality: CU Grand Reims

Government
  - Mayor (2020–2026): Raymond Ayala
- Area^{1}: 4.87 km^{2} (1.88 sq mi)
- Highest elevation: 161 m (528 ft)
- Lowest elevation: 94 m (308 ft)
- Population (2023): 481
  - Density: 98.8/km^{2} (256/sq mi)
- Time zone: UTC+01:00 (CET)
  - Summer (DST): UTC+02:00 (CEST)
- INSEE/Postal code: 51428 /51400
- ^{1} French Land Register data, which excludes lakes, ponds, glaciers > 1 km^{2} (0.386 sq mi or 247 acres) and river estuaries.

Les Petites-Loges (French pronunciation: [le pətit lɔʒ]) is a commune in the Marne department in north-eastern France.

== See also ==
- Communes of the Marne department
