= Villers-Allerand =

- Commune
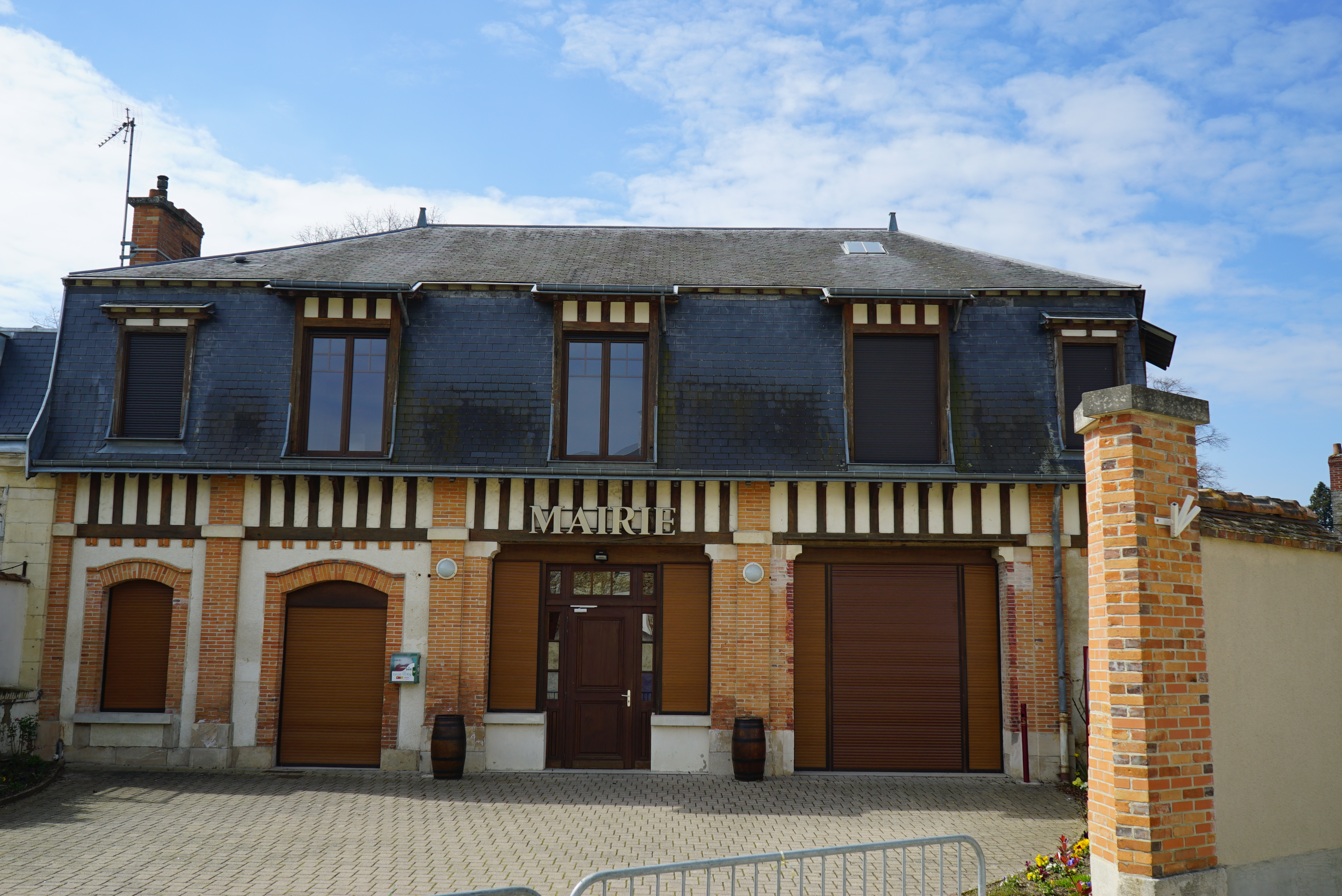
- The town hall in Villers-Allerand
- Location of Villers-Allerand
- Location within France Location within Grand Est
- Coordinates: 49°10′00″N 4°01′33″E
- Country: France
- Region: Grand Est
- Department: Marne
- Arrondissement: Reims
- Canton: Mourmelon-Vesle et Monts de Champagne
- Intercommunality: CU Grand Reims

Government
  - Mayor (2020–2026): Bernard Weiler
- Area^{1}: 12.3 km^{2} (4.7 sq mi)
- Highest elevation: 274 m (899 ft)
- Lowest elevation: 109 m (358 ft)
- Population (2023): 933
  - Density: 75.9/km^{2} (196/sq mi)
- Time zone: UTC+01:00 (CET)
  - Summer (DST): UTC+02:00 (CEST)
- INSEE/Postal code: 51629 /51500
- ^{1} French Land Register data, which excludes lakes, ponds, glaciers > 1 km^{2} (0.386 sq mi or 247 acres) and river estuaries.

Villers-Allerand (French pronunciation: [vilɛʁ alʁɑ̃]) is a commune in the Marne department in north-eastern France.

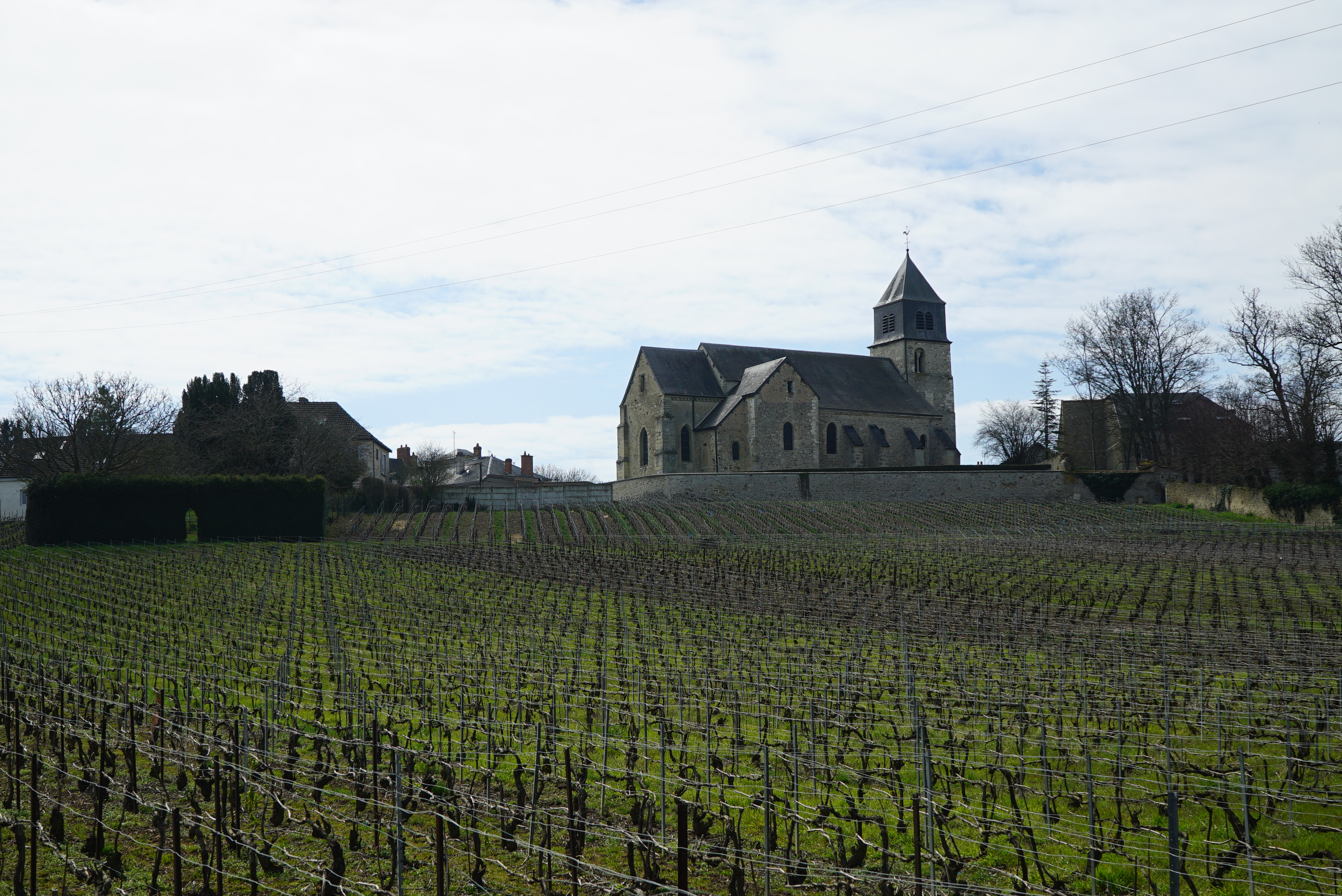
vineyard and church

== See also ==
- Communes of the Marne department
- Montagne de Reims Regional Natural Park
