= Trépail =

- Commune
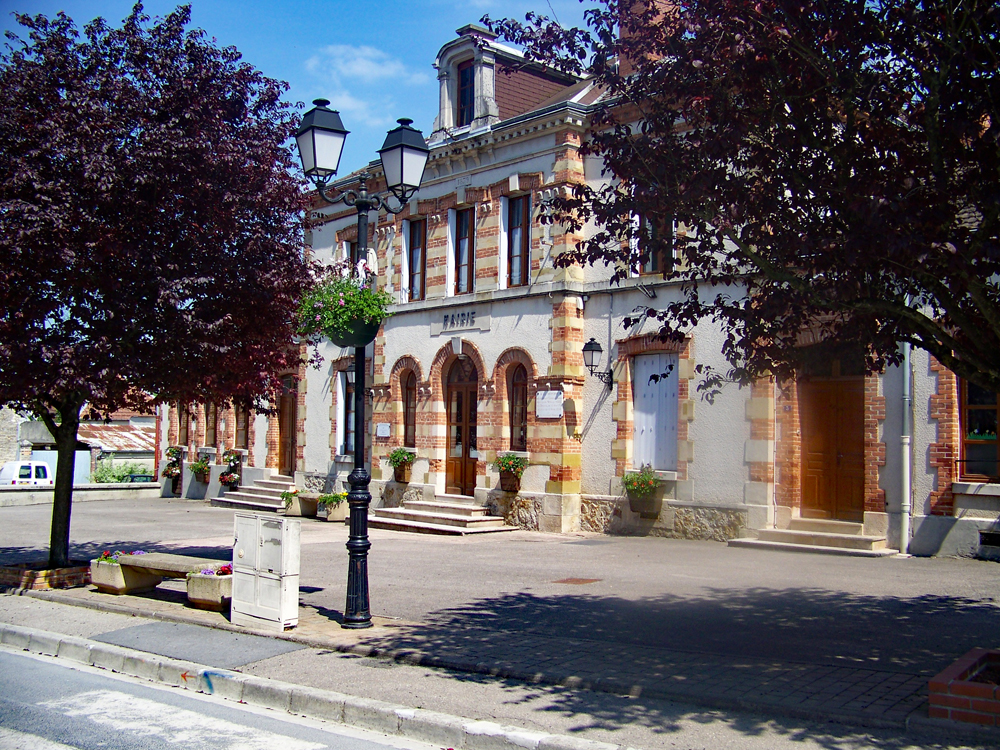
- The town hall in Trépail
- Location of Trépail
- Location within France Location within Grand Est
- Coordinates: 49°06′28″N 4°10′57″E
- Country: France
- Region: Grand Est
- Department: Marne
- Arrondissement: Reims
- Canton: Mourmelon-Vesle et Monts de Champagne
- Intercommunality: CU Grand Reims

Government
  - Mayor (2020–2026): Denis Boudville
- Area^{1}: 8.37 km^{2} (3.23 sq mi)
- Highest elevation: 286 m (938 ft)
- Lowest elevation: 120 m (390 ft)
- Population (2023): 424
  - Density: 50.7/km^{2} (131/sq mi)
- Time zone: UTC+01:00 (CET)
  - Summer (DST): UTC+02:00 (CEST)
- INSEE/Postal code: 51580 /51380
- ^{1} French Land Register data, which excludes lakes, ponds, glaciers > 1 km^{2} (0.386 sq mi or 247 acres) and river estuaries.

Trépail (French pronunciation: [tʁepaj]) is a commune in the Marne department in north-eastern France. As of 2023, the population of the commune was 424. Its inhabitants are referred to as Trépaillots and Trépaillotes in French.

== Geography ==
Trépail is located at the southeastern foot of the Montagne de Reims. The stream Ruisseau de Trépail runs through the village, and empties into the Aisne-Marne Canal at Vaudemange. The commune of Trépail covers an area of 8.37 km^{2}.

== Vineyards ==
Trépail is most famously known for its vast vineyards. The vineyards in Trépail are dominated by Chardonnay. Trépail shares the Chardonnay dominance with three of its neighbouring villages: Vaudemagne and Billy-le-Grand just below the slope, and Villers-Marmery, located to the north/northeast along the slope. This area is sometimes called the Perle blanche, and Trépail is probably the most well-known village of the area. The current vineyard surface in the Trépail commune is just under 700 acres. As of 2013, it is made up of about 90% Chardonnay and 10% Pinot Noir (9.5%).

== See also ==
- Communes of the Marne department
- Montagne de Reims Regional Natural Park
