= Arrondissement of Reims =

Coordinates: 49.25°N 4.03°E

Reims
- Arrondissement
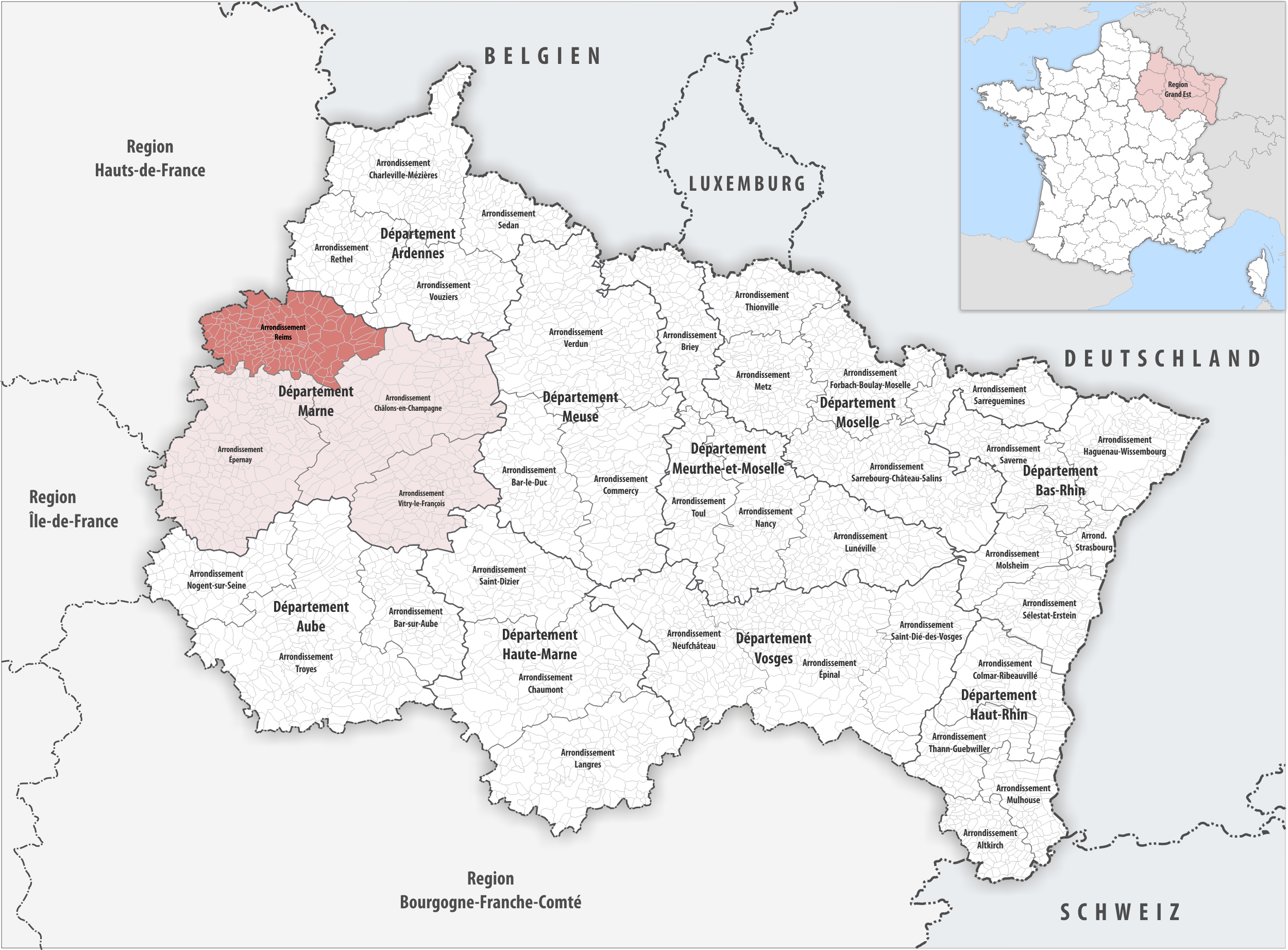
- Location within the region Grand Est
- Country: France
- Region: Grand Est
- Department: Marne
- No. of communes: {{{nbcomm}}}
- Area: 1,432.4 km^{2} (553.1 sq mi)
- Population (2023): 298,037
  - Density: 208.07/km^{2} (538.89/sq mi)
- INSEE code: 513

The Arrondissement of Reims (French: arrondissement de Reims) is an arrondissement of France in the Marne department, Grand Est. It has 143 communes. Its population is 297,068 (2021), and its area is 1,432.4 km^{2} (553.1 sq mi).

== Composition ==
The communes of the arrondissement of Reims, and their INSEE codes, are:

1. Anthenay (51012)
2. Aougny (51013)
3. Arcis-le-Ponsart (51014)
4. Aubérive (51019)
5. Aubilly (51020)
6. Auménancourt (51025)
7. Baslieux-lès-Fismes (51037)
8. Bazancourt (51043)
9. Beaumont-sur-Vesle (51044)
10. Beine-Nauroy (51046)
11. Berméricourt (51051)
12. Berru (51052)
13. Bétheniville (51054)
14. Bétheny (51055)
15. Bezannes (51058)
16. Billy-le-Grand (51061)
17. Bligny (51069)
18. Bouilly (51072)
19. Bouleuse (51073)
20. Boult-sur-Suippe (51074)
21. Bourgogne-Fresne (51075)
22. Bouvancourt (51077)
23. Branscourt (51081)
24. Breuil-sur-Vesle (51086)
25. Brimont (51088)
26. Brouillet (51089)
27. Caurel (51101)
28. Cauroy-lès-Hermonville (51102)
29. Cernay-lès-Reims (51105)
30. Châlons-sur-Vesle (51109)
31. Chambrecy (51111)
32. Chamery (51112)
33. Champfleury (51115)
34. Champigny (51118)
35. Chaumuzy (51140)
36. Chenay (51145)
37. Chigny-les-Roses (51152)
38. Cormicy (51171)
39. Cormontreuil (51172)
40. Coulommes-la-Montagne (51177)
41. Courcelles-Sapicourt (51181)
42. Courcy (51183)
43. Courlandon (51187)
44. Courmas (51188)
45. Courtagnon (51190)
46. Courville (51194)
47. Crugny (51198)
48. Cuisles (51201)
49. Dontrien (51216)
50. Écueil (51225)
51. Époye (51232)
52. Faverolles-et-Coëmy (51245)
53. Fismes (51250)
54. Germigny (51267)
55. Gueux (51282)
56. Hermonville (51291)
57. Heutrégiville (51293)
58. Hourges (51294)
59. Isles-sur-Suippe (51299)
60. Janvry (51305)
61. Jonchery-sur-Vesle (51308)
62. Jonquery (51309)
63. Jouy-lès-Reims (51310)
64. Lagery (51314)
65. Lavannes (51318)
66. Lhéry (51321)
67. Loivre (51329)
68. Ludes (51333)
69. Magneux (51337)
70. Mailly-Champagne (51338)
71. Marfaux (51348)
72. Merfy (51362)
73. Méry-Prémecy (51364)
74. Les Mesneux (51365)
75. Mont-sur-Courville (51382)
76. Montbré (51375)
77. Montigny-sur-Vesle (51379)
78. Muizon (51391)
79. Nogent-l'Abbesse (51403)
80. Olizy (51414)
81. Ormes (51418)
82. Pargny-lès-Reims (51422)
83. Les Petites-Loges (51428)
84. Pévy (51429)
85. Poilly (51437)
86. Pomacle (51439)
87. Pontfaverger-Moronvilliers (51440)
88. Pouillon (51444)
89. Pourcy (51445)
90. Prosnes (51447)
91. Prouilly (51448)
92. Prunay (51449)
93. Puisieulx (51450)
94. Reims (51454)
95. Rilly-la-Montagne (51461)
96. Romain (51464)
97. Romigny (51466)
98. Rosnay (51468)
99. Sacy (51471)
100. Saint-Brice-Courcelles (51474)
101. Saint-Étienne-sur-Suippe (51477)
102. Saint-Euphraise-et-Clairizet (51479)
103. Saint-Gilles (51484)
104. Saint-Hilaire-le-Petit (51487)
105. Saint-Léonard (51493)
106. Saint-Martin-l'Heureux (51503)
107. Saint-Masmes (51505)
108. Saint-Souplet-sur-Py (51517)
109. Saint-Thierry (51518)
110. Sarcy (51523)
111. Savigny-sur-Ardres (51527)
112. Selles (51529)
113. Sept-Saulx (51530)
114. Sermiers (51532)
115. Serzy-et-Prin (51534)
116. Sillery (51536)
117. Taissy (51562)
118. Thil (51568)
119. Thillois (51569)
120. Tinqueux (51573)
121. Tramery (51577)
122. Trépail (51580)
123. Treslon (51581)
124. Trigny (51582)
125. Trois-Puits (51584)
126. Unchair (51586)
127. Val-de-Vesle (51571)
128. Vandeuil (51591)
129. Vaudemange (51599)
130. Vaudesincourt (51600)
131. Ventelay (51604)
132. Verzenay (51613)
133. Verzy (51614)
134. Ville-Dommange (51622)
135. Ville-en-Selve (51623)
136. Ville-en-Tardenois (51624)
137. Villers-Allerand (51629)
138. Villers-aux-Nœuds (51631)
139. Villers-Franqueux (51633)
140. Villers-Marmery (51636)
141. Vrigny (51657)
142. Warmeriville (51660)
143. Witry-lès-Reims (51662)

== History ==
The arrondissement of Reims was created in 1800. In 2006 it lost the canton of Ay to the arrondissement of Épernay. At the April 2017 reorganisation of the arrondissements of Marne, it gained two communes from the arrondissement of Châlons-en-Champagne, and it lost one commune to the arrondissement of Châlons-en-Champagne and 13 communes to the arrondissement of Épernay.

As a result of the reorganisation of the cantons of France which came into effect in 2015, the borders of the cantons are no longer related to the borders of the arrondissements. The cantons of the arrondissement of Reims were, as of January 2015:

1. Beine-Nauroy
2. Bourgogne
3. Châtillon-sur-Marne
4. Fismes
5. Reims-1
6. Reims-2
7. Reims-3
8. Reims-4
9. Reims-5
10. Reims-6
11. Reims-7
12. Reims-8
13. Reims-9
14. Reims-10
15. Verzy
16. Ville-en-Tardenois
