= Billy-le-Grand =

- Commune
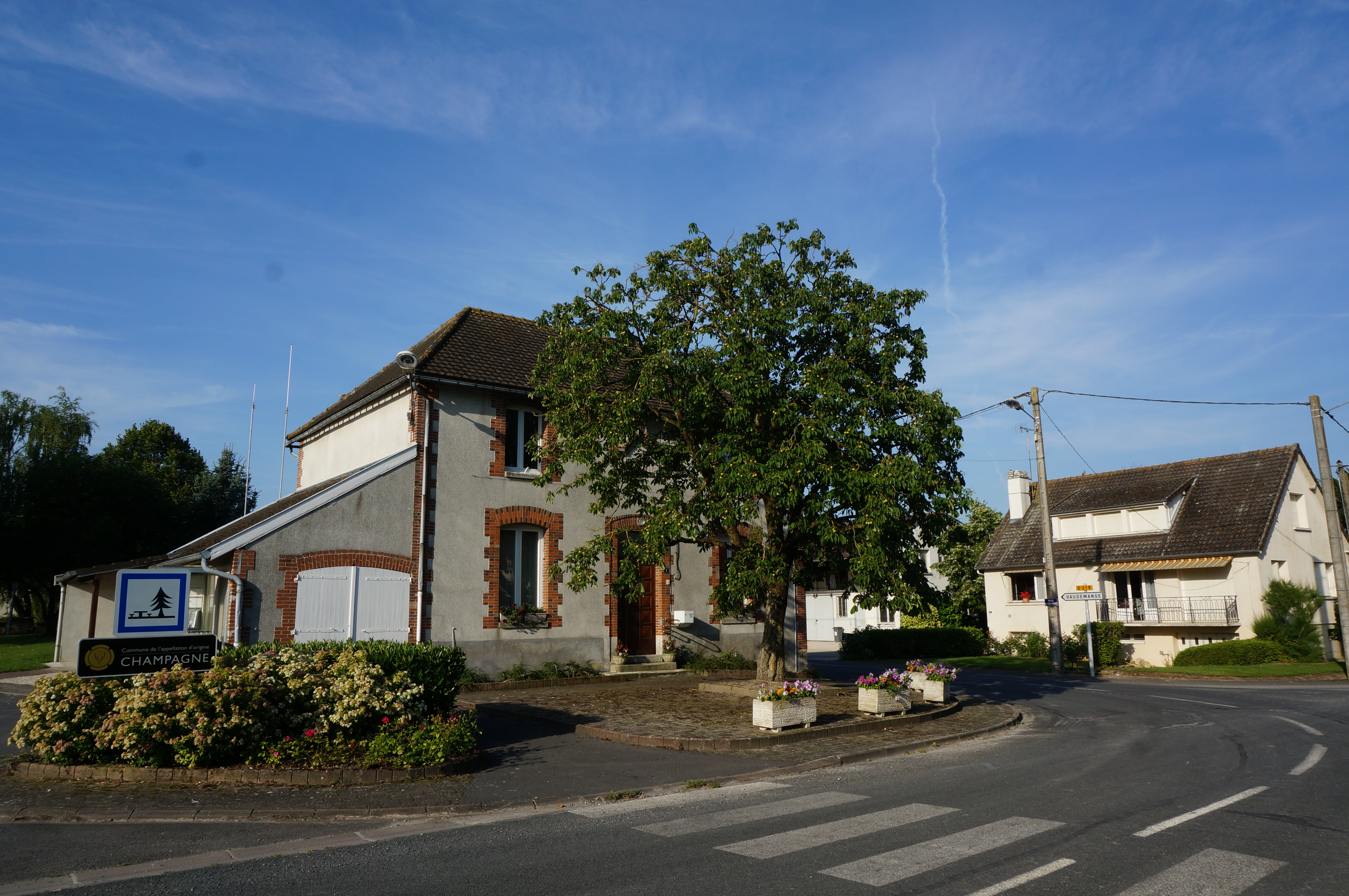
- The town hall in Billy-le-Grand
- Location of Billy-le-Grand
- Location within France Location within Grand Est
- Coordinates: 49°06′33″N 4°13′51″E
- Country: France
- Region: Grand Est
- Department: Marne
- Arrondissement: Reims
- Canton: Mourmelon-Vesle et Monts de Champagne
- Intercommunality: CU Grand Reims

Government
  - Mayor (2020–2026): Fabien Charpentier
- Area^{1}: 7.26 km^{2} (2.80 sq mi)
- Elevation: 122 m (400 ft)
- Population (2023): 149
  - Density: 20.5/km^{2} (53.2/sq mi)
- Time zone: UTC+01:00 (CET)
  - Summer (DST): UTC+02:00 (CEST)
- INSEE/Postal code: 51061 /51400
- ^{1} French Land Register data, which excludes lakes, ponds, glaciers > 1 km^{2} (0.386 sq mi or 247 acres) and river estuaries.

Billy-le-Grand is a commune of the Marne department in northeastern France.

== Population ==
Historical population
Year	Pop.	±% p.a.
1968	56	—
1975	46	−2.77%
1982	53	+2.04%
1990	77	+4.78%
1999	99	+2.83%
2007	98	−0.13%
2012	123	+4.65%
2017	121	−0.33%
2023	149	+3.53%
Source: INSEE

== See also ==
- Communes of the Marne department
