= Mourmelon-le-Grand =

- Commune
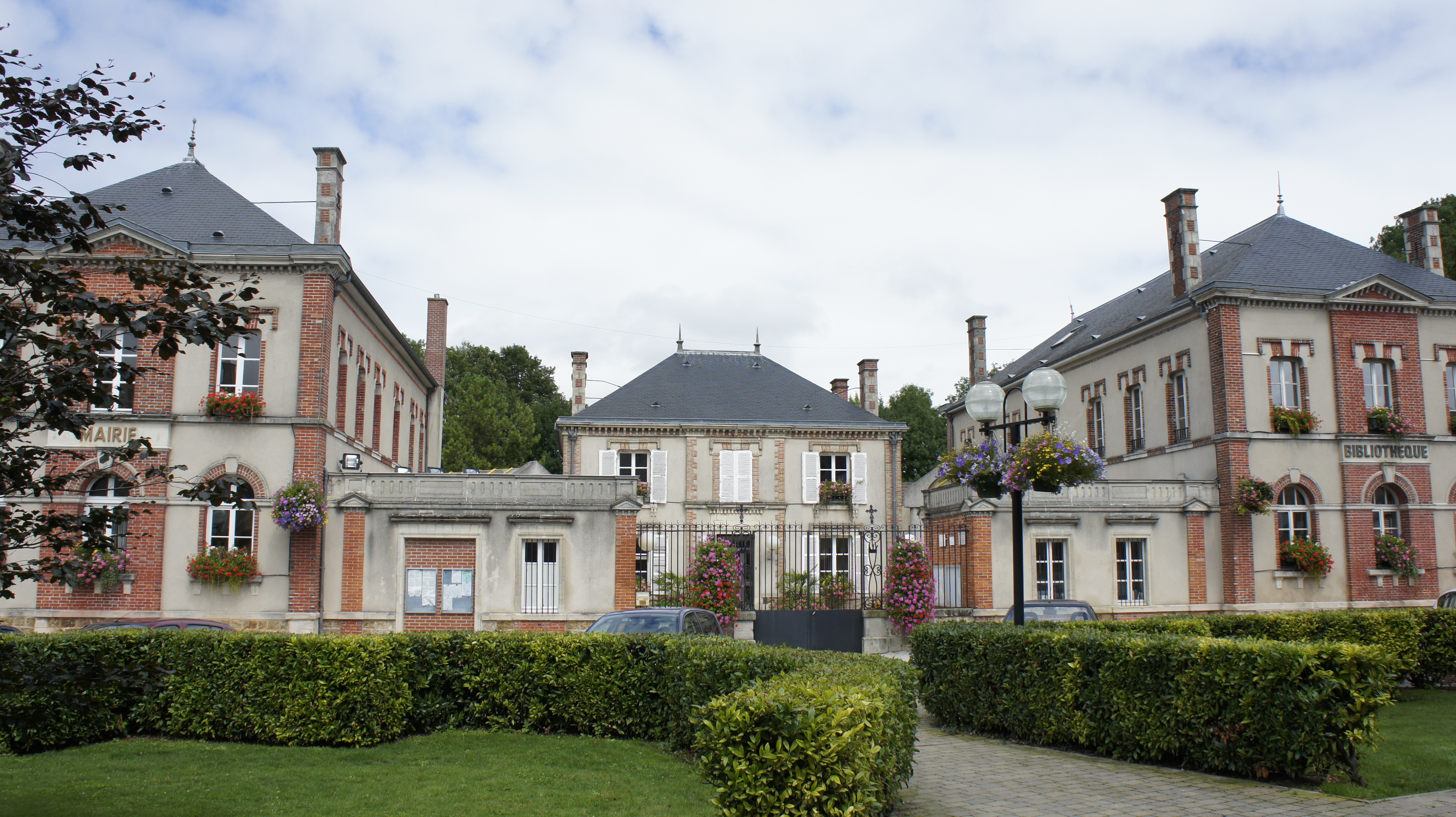
- The town hall in Mourmelon-le-Grand

- Coat of arms
- Location of Mourmelon-le-Grand
- Location within France Location within Grand Est
- Coordinates: 49°08′24″N 4°21′57″E
- Country: France
- Region: Grand Est
- Department: Marne
- Arrondissement: Châlons-en-Champagne
- Canton: Mourmelon-Vesle et Monts de Champagne
- Intercommunality: CA Châlons-en-Champagne

Government
  - Mayor (2020–2026): Pascal Jaloux
- Area^{1}: 23.21 km^{2} (8.96 sq mi)
- Elevation: 112 m (367 ft)
- Population (2023): 4,895
  - Density: 210.9/km^{2} (546.2/sq mi)
- Time zone: UTC+01:00 (CET)
  - Summer (DST): UTC+02:00 (CEST)
- INSEE/Postal code: 51388 /51400
- ^{1} French Land Register data, which excludes lakes, ponds, glaciers > 1 km^{2} (0.386 sq mi or 247 acres) and river estuaries.

Mourmelon-le-Grand (French pronunciation: [muʁməlɔ̃ lə ɡʁɑ̃]; lit. 'Mourmelon-the-Great') is a commune in the Marne department in northeastern France.

== Population ==
Historical population
Year	Pop.	±% p.a.
1968	4,224	—
1975	4,066	−0.54%
1982	3,862	−0.73%
1990	4,240	+1.17%
1999	4,655	+1.04%
2007	5,044	+1.01%
2012	5,324	+1.09%
2017	5,085	−0.91%
2023	4,895	−0.63%
Source: INSEE

== Climate ==
On average, Mourmelon-le-Grand experiences 84.4 days per year with a minimum temperature below 0 °C (32.0 °F), 4.6 days per year with a minimum temperature below −10 °C (14.0 °F), 5.3 days per year with a maximum temperature below 0 °C (32.0 °F), and 14.6 days per year with a maximum temperature above 30 °C (86.0 °F). The record high temperature was 41.3 °C (106.3 °F) on July 25, 2019, while the record low temperature was −19.7 °C (−3.5 °F) on February 7, 2012.

Climate data for Mourmelon-le-Grand (1991–2020 normals, extremes 2004–present)
Month	Jan	Feb	Mar	Apr	May	Jun	Jul	Aug	Sep	Oct	Nov	Dec	Year
Record high °C (°F)	15.3 (59.5)	21.1 (70.0)	25.5 (77.9)	28.6 (83.5)	32.7 (90.9)	36.7 (98.1)	41.3 (106.3)	38.4 (101.1)	34.5 (94.1)	27.6 (81.7)	22.5 (72.5)	17.1 (62.8)	41.3 (106.3)
Mean daily maximum °C (°F)	6.3 (43.3)	7.8 (46.0)	12.1 (53.8)	17.1 (62.8)	20.0 (68.0)	23.6 (74.5)	26.1 (79.0)	25.2 (77.4)	21.8 (71.2)	16.7 (62.1)	10.5 (50.9)	6.9 (44.4)	16.2 (61.1)
Daily mean °C (°F)	2.9 (37.2)	3.6 (38.5)	6.3 (43.3)	9.9 (49.8)	13.3 (55.9)	16.9 (62.4)	19.1 (66.4)	18.2 (64.8)	15.0 (59.0)	11.5 (52.7)	6.7 (44.1)	3.6 (38.5)	10.6 (51.1)
Mean daily minimum °C (°F)	−0.4 (31.3)	−0.7 (30.7)	0.4 (32.7)	2.8 (37.0)	6.7 (44.1)	10.2 (50.4)	12.0 (53.6)	11.3 (52.3)	8.2 (46.8)	6.4 (43.5)	2.9 (37.2)	0.3 (32.5)	5.0 (41.0)
Record low °C (°F)	−15.4 (4.3)	−19.7 (−3.5)	−15.7 (3.7)	−9.3 (15.3)	−4.4 (24.1)	−1.5 (29.3)	1.0 (33.8)	−0.9 (30.4)	−2.5 (27.5)	−7.7 (18.1)	−11.0 (12.2)	−16.8 (1.8)	−19.7 (−3.5)
Average precipitation mm (inches)	53.6 (2.11)	51.9 (2.04)	47.7 (1.88)	35.7 (1.41)	67.5 (2.66)	57.2 (2.25)	57.5 (2.26)	59.6 (2.35)	42.6 (1.68)	54.3 (2.14)	52.1 (2.05)	71.7 (2.82)	651.4 (25.65)
Average precipitation days (≥ 1.0 mm)	11.8	11.3	10.1	7.4	10.4	8.5	8.2	9.1	6.9	9.2	10.3	12.8	116.0
Source: Meteociel

== Camp de Châlons ==
The camp de Châlons, also known as camp de Mourmelon, is a military camp of circa 10,000 hectares near Mourmelon-le-Grand. It was created at the behest of Napoleon III and opened August 30, 1857, during the Second French Empire.

The Russian Expeditionary Force in France was stationed here in September 1916.

The camp is used for military manoeuvres, and cavalry training, along with the neighbouring 2,500 hectare large Camp de Moronvilliers.

It was also selected to host the shooting events for the 1924 Summer Olympics in neighbouring Paris

During the Second World War, it served as the quarters for the US Army's 501st Infantry Regiment, 101st Airborne Division - who were recovering from the fighting in The Netherlands and waiting on replacements. The regiment would soon play a crucial role in the Battle of Bastogne.

== See also ==
- Communes of the Marne department
