= Anthenay =

- Commune
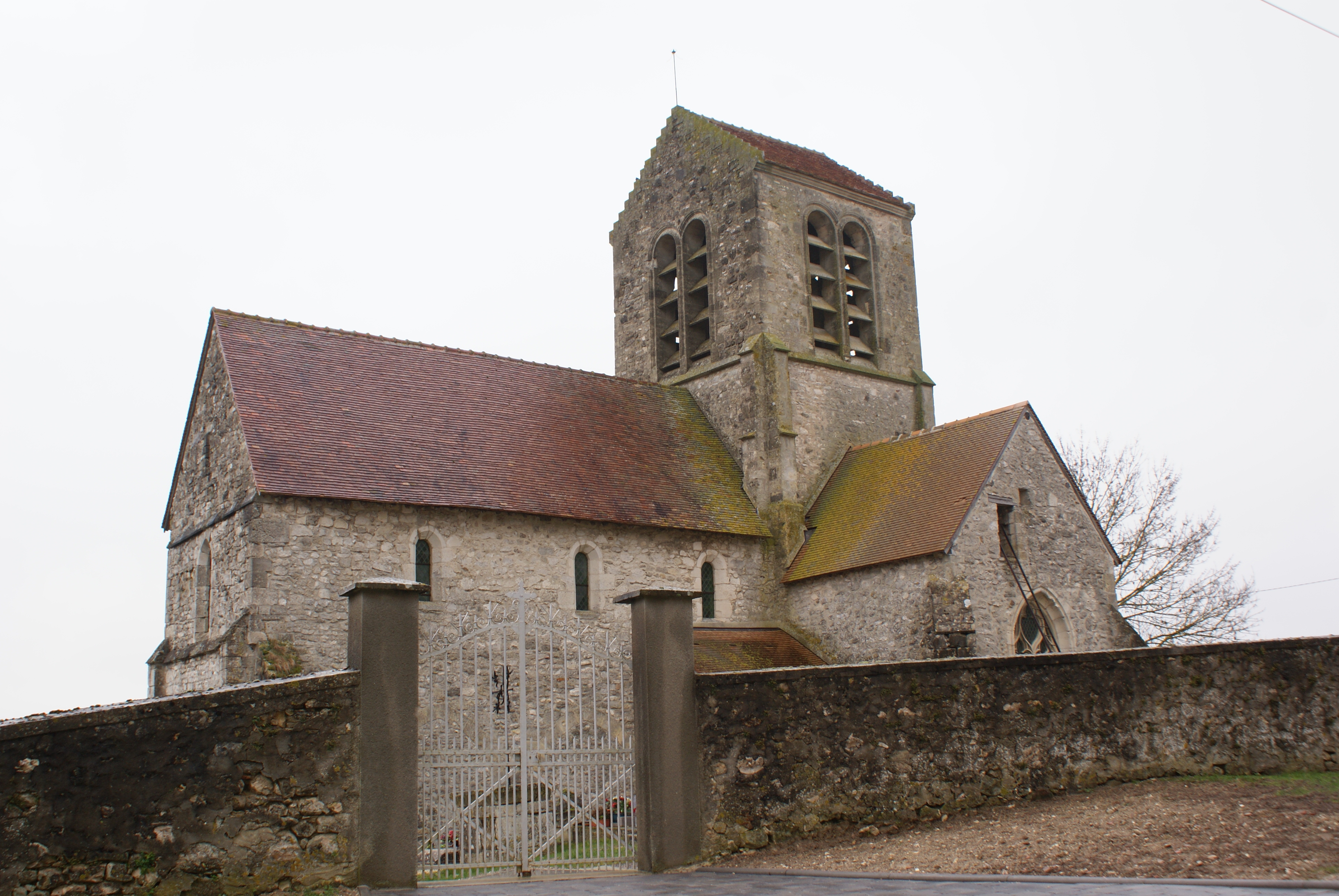
- Church.
- Location of Anthenay
- Location within France Location within Grand Est
- Coordinates: 49°08′32″N 3°44′06″E
- Country: France
- Region: Grand Est
- Department: Marne
- Arrondissement: Reims
- Canton: Dormans-Paysages de Champagne
- Intercommunality: CU Grand Reims

Government
  - Mayor (2020–2026): Cathy Laurin
- Area^{1}: 6.64 km^{2} (2.56 sq mi)
- Elevation: 187 m (614 ft)
- Population (2023): 70
  - Density: 11/km^{2} (27/sq mi)
- Time zone: UTC+01:00 (CET)
  - Summer (DST): UTC+02:00 (CEST)
- INSEE/Postal code: 51012 /51700
- ^{1} French Land Register data, which excludes lakes, ponds, glaciers > 1 km^{2} (0.386 sq mi or 247 acres) and river estuaries.

Anthenay (French pronunciation: [ɑ̃tnɛ]) is a commune in the Marne department in northeastern France.

== Population ==
Historical population
Year	Pop.	±% p.a.
1968	60	—
1975	44	−4.33%
1982	45	+0.32%
1990	52	+1.82%
1999	52	+0.00%
2007	55	+0.70%
2012	79	+7.51%
2017	70	−2.39%
2023	70	+0.00%
Source: INSEE

== See also ==
- Communes of the Marne department
