= Villers-Marmery =

- Commune
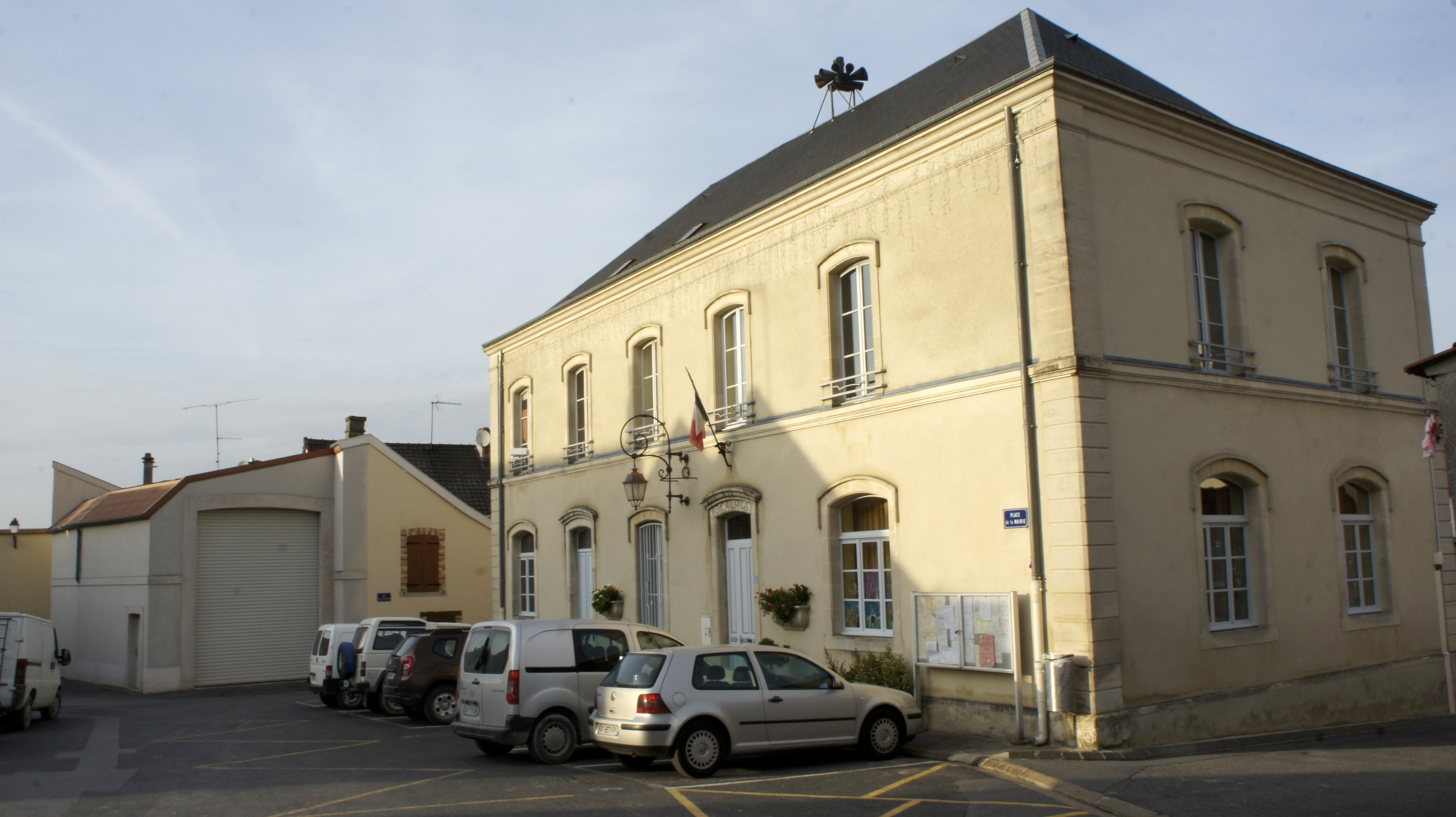
- The town hall in Villers-Marmery
- Location of Villers-Marmery
- Location within France Location within Grand Est
- Coordinates: 49°08′10″N 4°11′51″E
- Country: France
- Region: Grand Est
- Department: Marne
- Arrondissement: Reims
- Canton: Mourmelon-Vesle et Monts de Champagne
- Intercommunality: CU Grand Reims

Government
  - Mayor (2020–2026): Marie Noëlle Rainon
- Area^{1}: 10.73 km^{2} (4.14 sq mi)
- Highest elevation: 287 m (942 ft)
- Lowest elevation: 101 m (331 ft)
- Population (2023): 579
  - Density: 54.0/km^{2} (140/sq mi)
- Time zone: UTC+01:00 (CET)
  - Summer (DST): UTC+02:00 (CEST)
- INSEE/Postal code: 51636 /51380
- ^{1} French Land Register data, which excludes lakes, ponds, glaciers > 1 km^{2} (0.386 sq mi or 247 acres) and river estuaries.

Villers-Marmery (French pronunciation: [vilɛʁ maʁməʁi]) is a commune in the Marne department in north-eastern France.

== See also ==
- Communes of the Marne department
- Montagne de Reims Regional Natural Park
