= Canton of Mourmelon-Vesle et Monts de Champagne =

Coordinates: 49.14°N 4.36°E

The canton of Mourmelon-Vesle et Monts de Champagne (French pronunciation: [muʁməlɔ̃ vɛl e mɔ̃ də ʃɑ̃paɲ]) is an administrative division of the Marne department, northeastern France. It was created at the French canton reorganisation which came into effect in March 2015. Its seat is in Mourmelon-le-Grand.

It consists of the following communes:

1. Aubérive
2. Baconnes
3. Beaumont-sur-Vesle
4. Bétheniville
5. Billy-le-Grand
6. Bouy
7. Chigny-les-Roses
8. Dontrien
9. Époye
10. Livry-Louvercy
11. Ludes
12. Mailly-Champagne
13. Montbré
14. Mourmelon-le-Grand
15. Mourmelon-le-Petit
16. La Neuville-au-Temple
17. Les Petites-Loges
18. Pontfaverger-Moronvilliers
19. Prosnes
20. Rilly-la-Montagne
21. Saint-Hilaire-le-Petit
22. Saint-Martin-l'Heureux
23. Saint-Masmes
24. Saint-Souplet-sur-Py
25. Selles
26. Sept-Saulx
27. Trépail
28. Vadenay
29. Val-de-Vesle
30. Vaudemange
31. Vaudesincourt
32. Verzenay
33. Verzy
34. Ville-en-Selve
35. Villers-Allerand
36. Villers-Marmery
