= Aougny =

- Commune
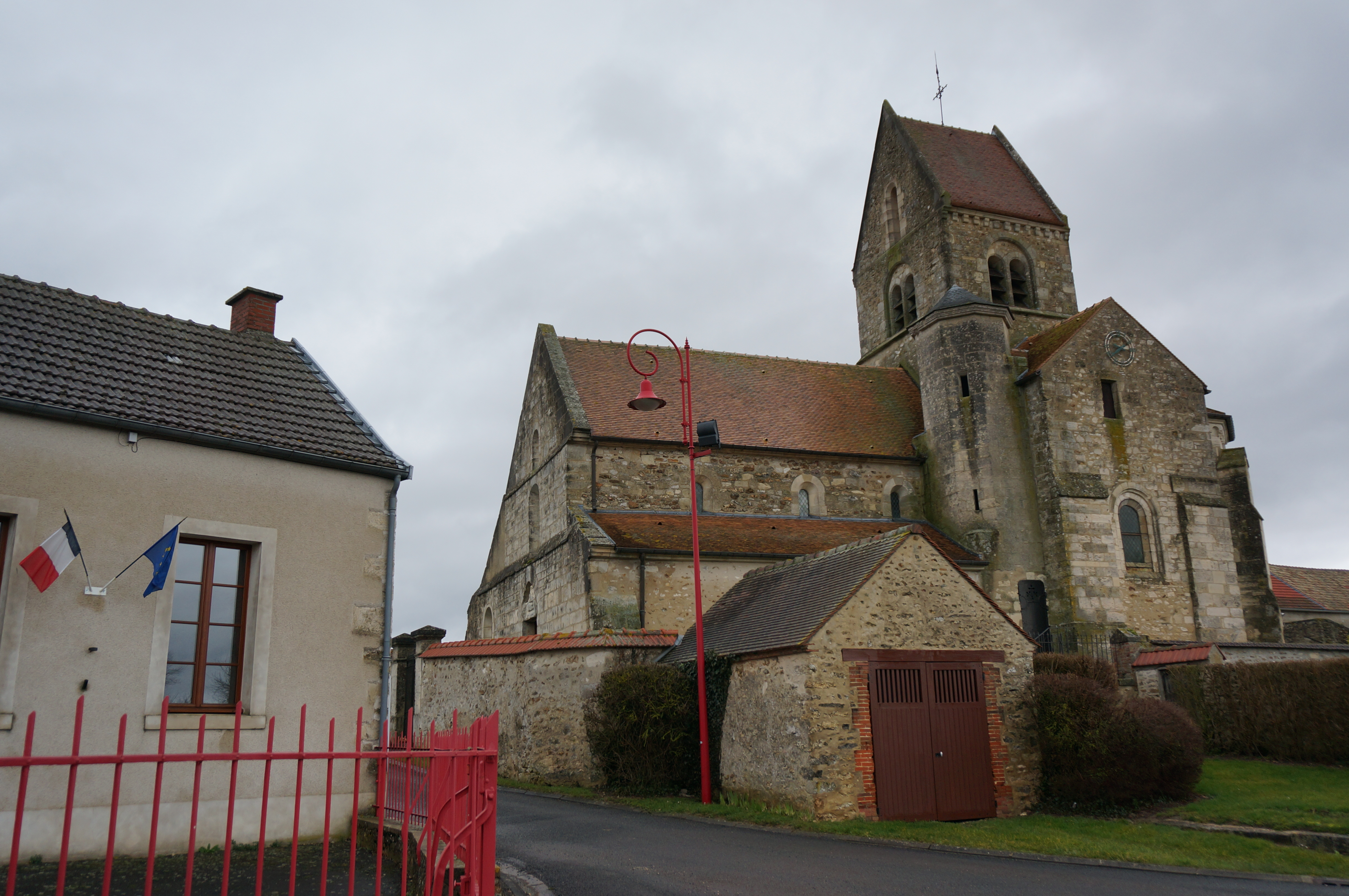
- The town hall and church in Aougny
- Location of Aougny
- Location within France Location within Grand Est
- Coordinates: 49°10′52″N 3°43′35″E
- Country: France
- Region: Grand Est
- Department: Marne
- Arrondissement: Reims
- Canton: Dormans-Paysages de Champagne
- Intercommunality: CU Grand Reims

Government
  - Mayor (2020–2026): Christian Berlot
- Area^{1}: 7.47 km^{2} (2.88 sq mi)
- Elevation: 208 m (682 ft)
- Population (2023): 103
  - Density: 13.8/km^{2} (35.7/sq mi)
- Time zone: UTC+01:00 (CET)
  - Summer (DST): UTC+02:00 (CEST)
- INSEE/Postal code: 51013 /51170
- ^{1} French Land Register data, which excludes lakes, ponds, glaciers > 1 km^{2} (0.386 sq mi or 247 acres) and river estuaries.

Aougny (french pronunciation: [oɲi]) is a commune in the Marne department in northeastern France.

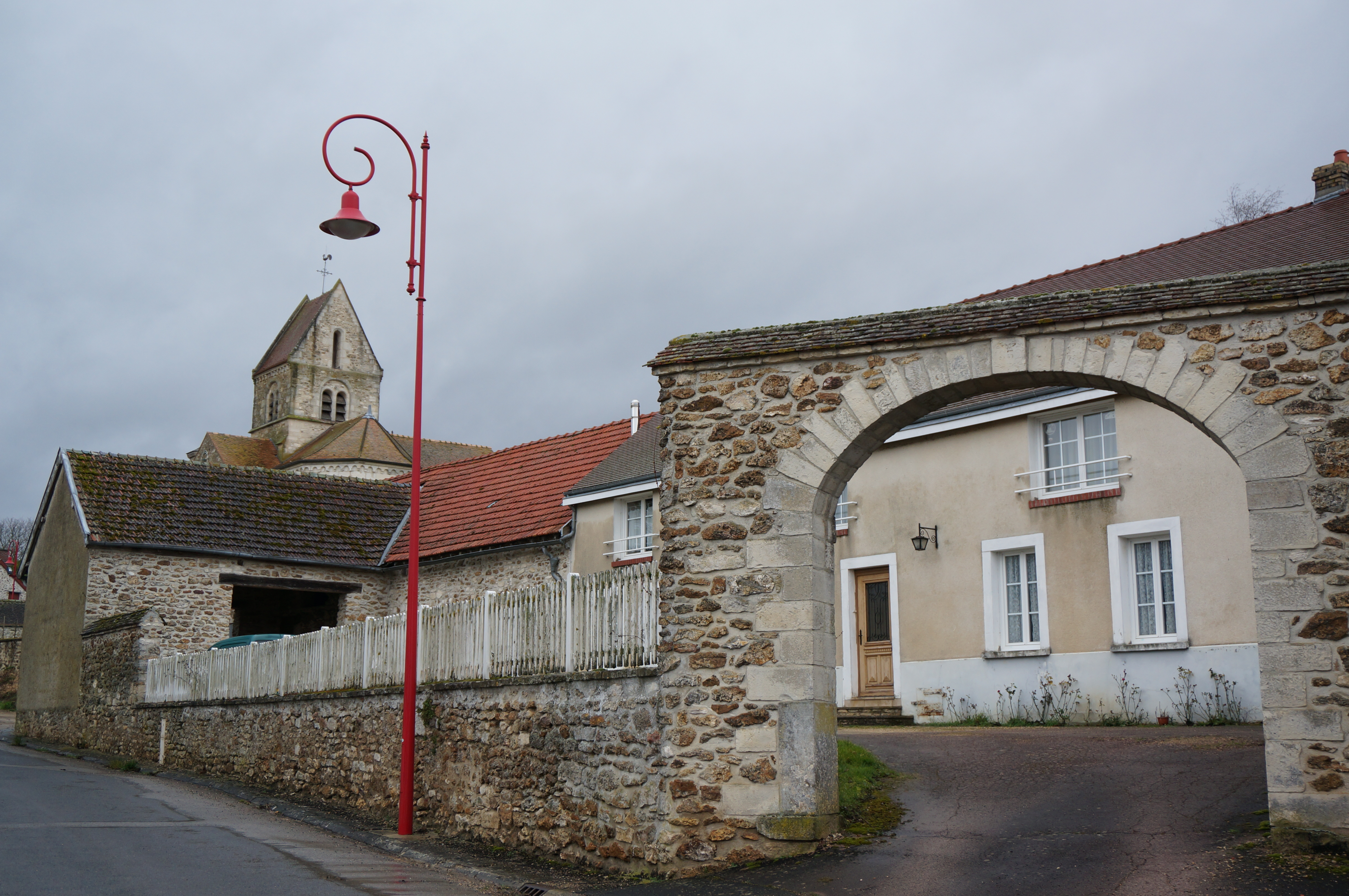

== Population ==
Historical population
| Year | Pop. | ±% p.a. |
|---|---|---|
| 1968 | 90 | — |
| 1975 | 73 | −2.95% |
| 1982 | 51 | −4.99% |
| 1990 | 54 | +0.72% |
| 1999 | 56 | +0.40% |
| 2007 | 92 | +6.40% |
| 2012 | 106 | +2.87% |
| 2017 | 100 | −1.16% |
| 2023 | 103 | +0.49% |
Source: INSEE

== See also ==
- Communes of the Marne department
