= Bouilly =

Bouilly is the name or part of the name of the following communes in France:

- Bouilly, Aube, in the Aube department
- Bouilly, Marne, in the Marne department
- Bouilly-en-Gâtinais, in the Loiret department

== People ==
- Delphine Bouilly, Canadian nanoscientist
- Jean-Nicolas Bouilly, author
