= Janvry =

Janvry is the name of two communes in France:

- Janvry, Marne
- Janvry, Essonne
