= Germigny =

Germigny may refer to the following communes in France:

- Germigny, Marne, in the Marne department
- Germigny, Yonne, in the Yonne department
- Germigny-des-Prés, in the Loiret department
- Germigny-l'Évêque, in the Seine-et-Marne department
- Germigny-l'Exempt, in the Cher department
- Germigny-sous-Coulombs, in the Seine-et-Marne department
- Germigny-sur-Loire, in the Nièvre department
