= Les Mesneux =

Mesneux
- Commune
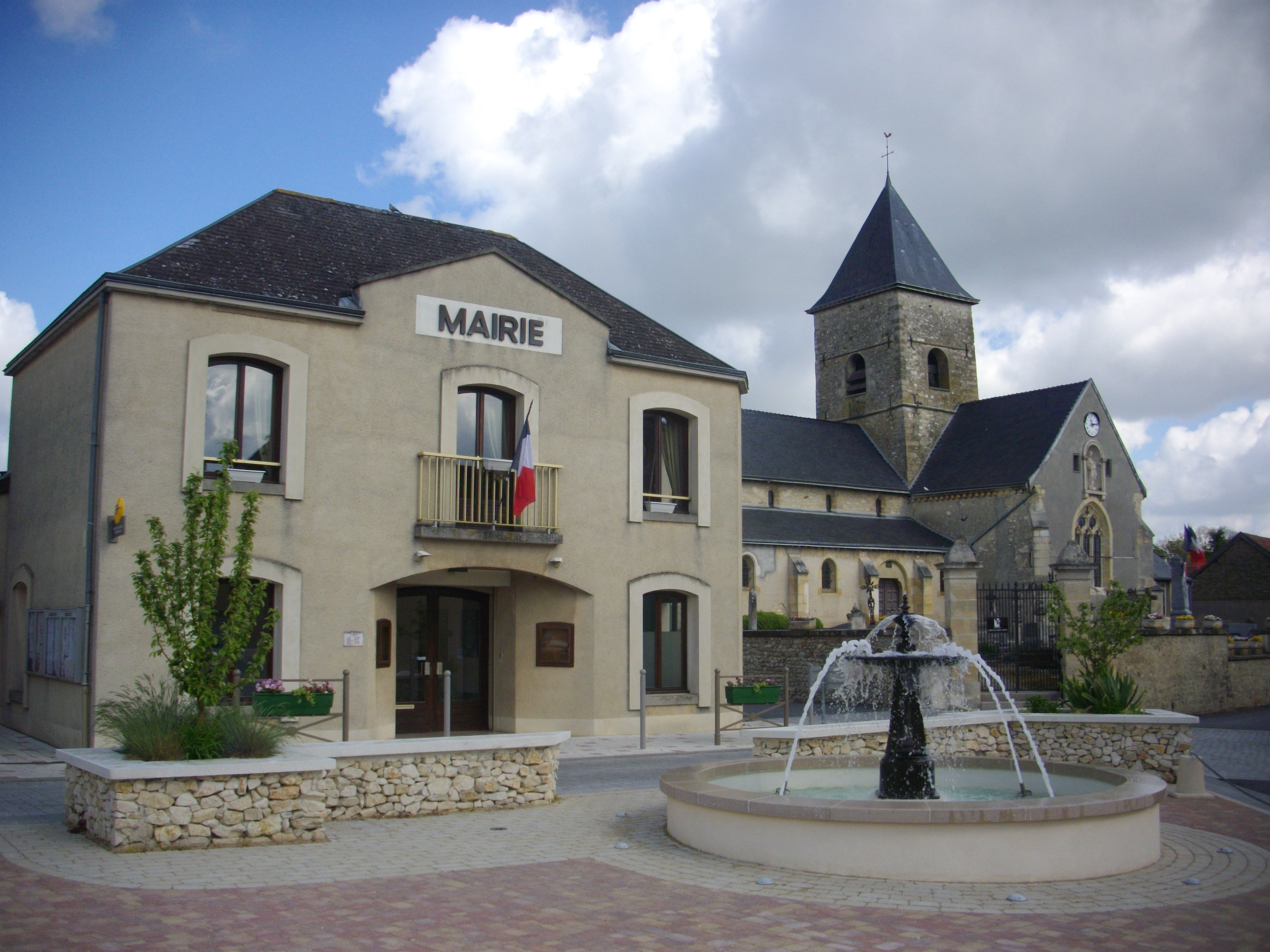
- The town hall and church in Les Mesneux
- Location of Mesneux
- Location within France Location within Grand Est
- Coordinates: 49°13′08″N 3°57′43″E
- Country: France
- Region: Grand Est
- Department: Marne
- Arrondissement: Reims
- Canton: Fismes-Montagne de Reims
- Intercommunality: CU Grand Reims

Government
  - Mayor (2020–2026): Anny Dessoy
- Area^{1}: 4.26 km^{2} (1.64 sq mi)
- Elevation: 90 m (300 ft)
- Population (2023): 966
  - Density: 227/km^{2} (587/sq mi)
- Time zone: UTC+01:00 (CET)
  - Summer (DST): UTC+02:00 (CEST)
- INSEE/Postal code: 51365 /51370
- ^{1} French Land Register data, which excludes lakes, ponds, glaciers > 1 km^{2} (0.386 sq mi or 247 acres) and river estuaries.

Les Mesneux (French pronunciation: [le mɛnø]) is a commune in the Marne department in the Grand Est region in north-eastern France.

== See also ==
- Communes of the Marne department
