= Bouleuse =

- Commune
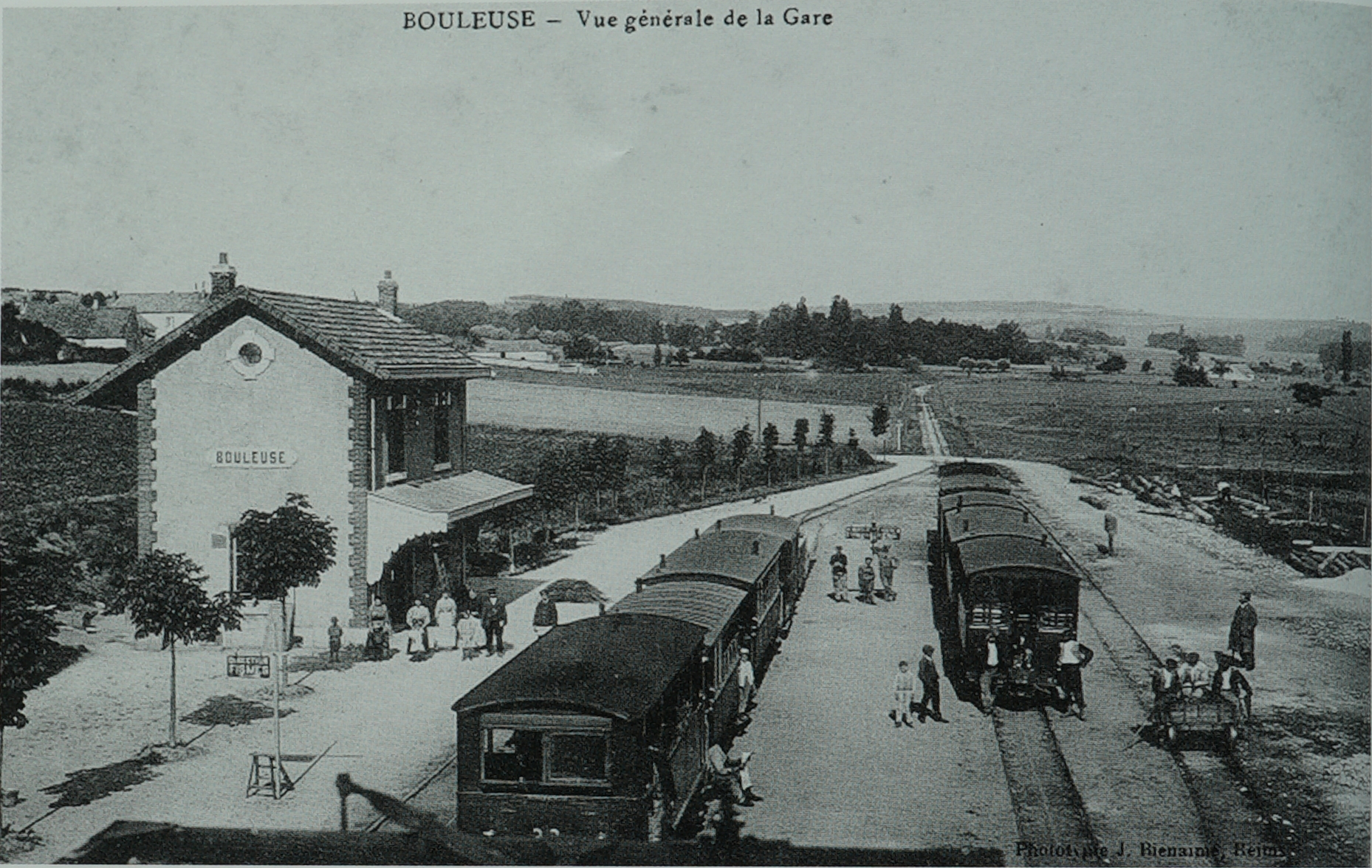
- The railway station in 1905

- Coat of arms
- Location of Bouleuse
- Location within France Location within Grand Est
- Coordinates: 49°13′32″N 3°50′30″E
- Country: France
- Region: Grand Est
- Department: Marne
- Arrondissement: Reims
- Canton: Fismes-Montagne de Reims
- Intercommunality: CU Grand Reims

Government
  - Mayor (2020–2026): Patrick Simon
- Area^{1}: 4.11 km^{2} (1.59 sq mi)
- Elevation: 150 m (490 ft)
- Population (2023): 221
  - Density: 53.8/km^{2} (139/sq mi)
- Time zone: UTC+01:00 (CET)
  - Summer (DST): UTC+02:00 (CEST)
- INSEE/Postal code: 51073 /51170
- ^{1} French Land Register data, which excludes lakes, ponds, glaciers > 1 km^{2} (0.386 sq mi or 247 acres) and river estuaries.

Bouleuse (French pronunciation: [buløz]) is a commune of the Marne department in northeastern France.

== Population ==
Historical population
| Year | Pop. | ±% p.a. |
|---|---|---|
| 1968 | 122 | — |
| 1975 | 109 | −1.60% |
| 1982 | 143 | +3.95% |
| 1990 | 161 | +1.49% |
| 1999 | 165 | +0.27% |
| 2007 | 167 | +0.15% |
| 2012 | 184 | +1.96% |
| 2017 | 212 | +2.87% |
| 2023 | 221 | +0.70% |
Source: INSEE

== See also ==
- Communes of the Marne department
- Montagne de Reims Regional Natural Park
