= Mont-sur-Courville =

- Commune
- Location of Mont-sur-Courville
- Location within France Location within Grand Est
- Coordinates: 49°15′37″N 3°40′55″E
- Country: France
- Region: Grand Est
- Department: Marne
- Arrondissement: Reims
- Canton: Fismes-Montagne de Reims
- Intercommunality: CU Grand Reims

Government
  - Mayor (2020–2026): Jacqueline Lopata
- Area^{1}: 5.94 km^{2} (2.29 sq mi)
- Elevation: 134 m (440 ft)
- Population (2023): 119
  - Density: 20.0/km^{2} (51.9/sq mi)
- Time zone: UTC+01:00 (CET)
  - Summer (DST): UTC+02:00 (CEST)
- INSEE/Postal code: 51382 /51170
- ^{1} French Land Register data, which excludes lakes, ponds, glaciers > 1 km^{2} (0.386 sq mi or 247 acres) and river estuaries.

Mont-sur-Courville (French pronunciation: [mɔ̃ syʁ kuʁvil]) is a commune in the Marne department in north-eastern France.

== See also ==
- Communes of the Marne department
