= Pévy =

- Commune
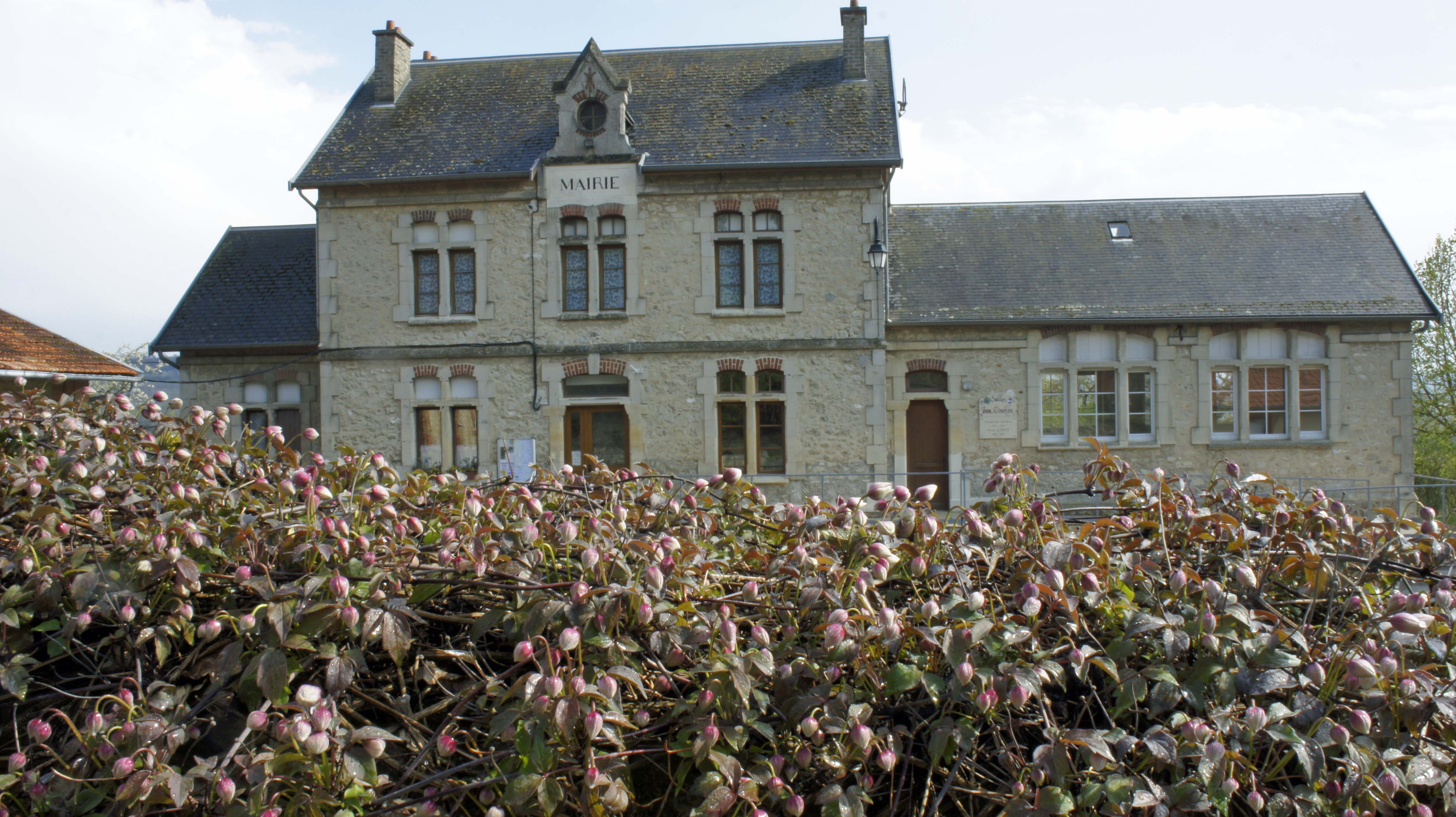
- The town hall in Pévy

- Coat of arms
- Location of Pévy
- Location within France Location within Grand Est
- Coordinates: 49°18′41″N 3°50′39″E
- Country: France
- Region: Grand Est
- Department: Marne
- Arrondissement: Reims
- Canton: Fismes-Montagne de Reims
- Intercommunality: CU Grand Reims

Government
  - Mayor (2020–2026): Daniel Vaquette
- Area^{1}: 7.4 km^{2} (2.9 sq mi)
- Elevation: 210 m (690 ft)
- Highest elevation: 214 m (702 ft)
- Lowest elevation: 87 m (285 ft)
- Population (2023): 235
  - Density: 32/km^{2} (82/sq mi)
- Time zone: UTC+01:00 (CET)
  - Summer (DST): UTC+02:00 (CEST)
- INSEE/Postal code: 51429 /51140
- ^{1} French Land Register data, which excludes lakes, ponds, glaciers > 1 km^{2} (0.386 sq mi or 247 acres) and river estuaries.

Pévy (French pronunciation: [pevi]) is a commune in the Marne department in north-eastern France.

== See also ==
- Communes of the Marne department
