= Châlons-sur-Vesle =

- Commune
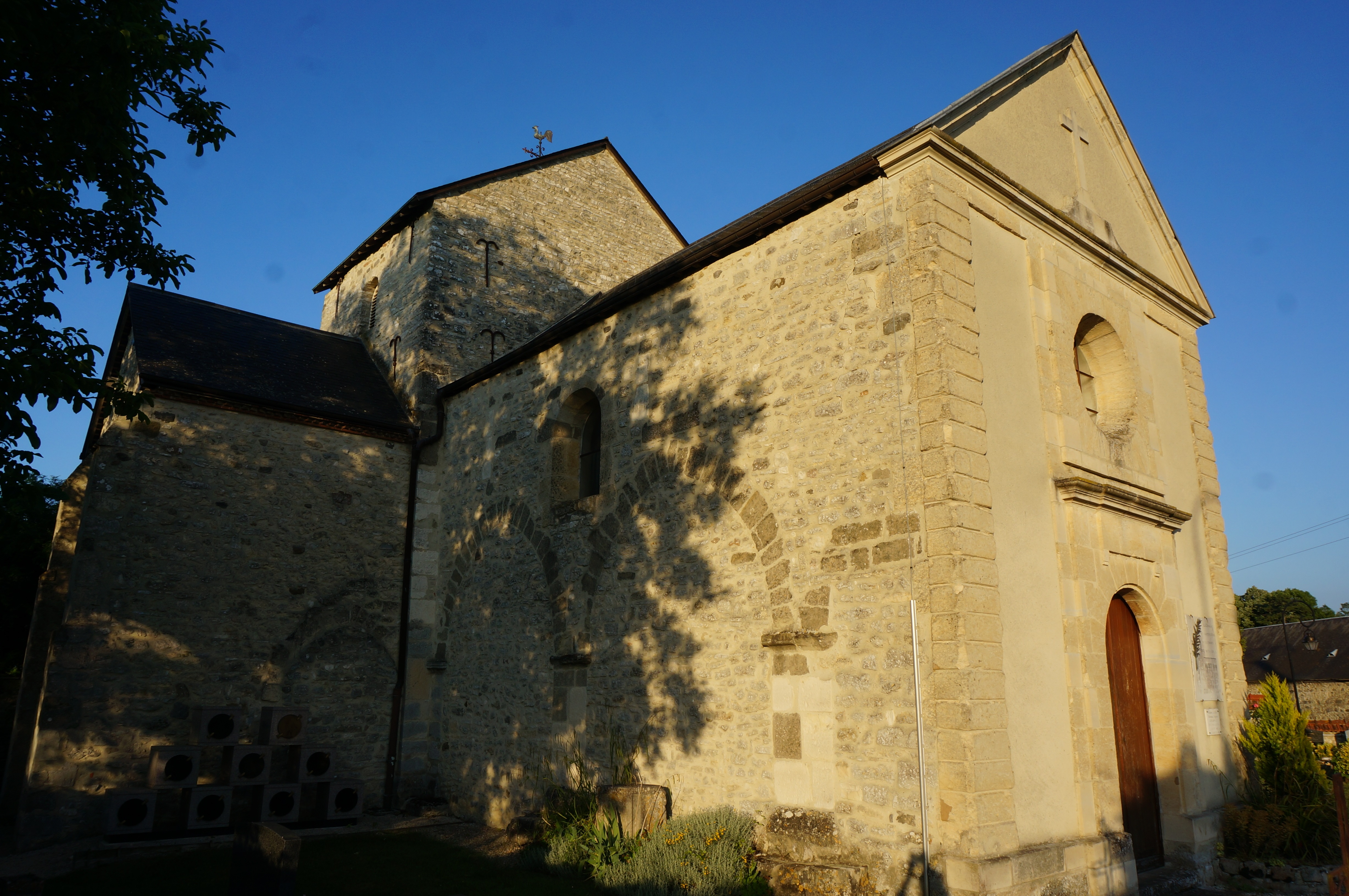
- The church in Châlons-sur-Vesle
- Location of Châlons-sur-Vesle
- Location within France Location within Grand Est
- Coordinates: 49°17′24″N 3°55′03″E
- Country: France
- Region: Grand Est
- Department: Marne
- Arrondissement: Reims
- Canton: Fismes-Montagne de Reims
- Intercommunality: CU Grand Reims

Government
  - Mayor (2020–2026): Martial Dupin
- Area^{1}: 4.45 km^{2} (1.72 sq mi)
- Elevation: 106 m (348 ft)
- Population (2023): 206
  - Density: 46.3/km^{2} (120/sq mi)
- Time zone: UTC+01:00 (CET)
  - Summer (DST): UTC+02:00 (CEST)
- INSEE/Postal code: 51109 /51140
- ^{1} French Land Register data, which excludes lakes, ponds, glaciers > 1 km^{2} (0.386 sq mi or 247 acres) and river estuaries.

Châlons-sur-Vesle (French pronunciation: [ʃalɔ̃ syʁ vɛl], literally Châlons on Vesle) is a commune in the Marne department in north-eastern France.

== See also ==
- Communes of the Marne department
