= Branscourt =

- Commune
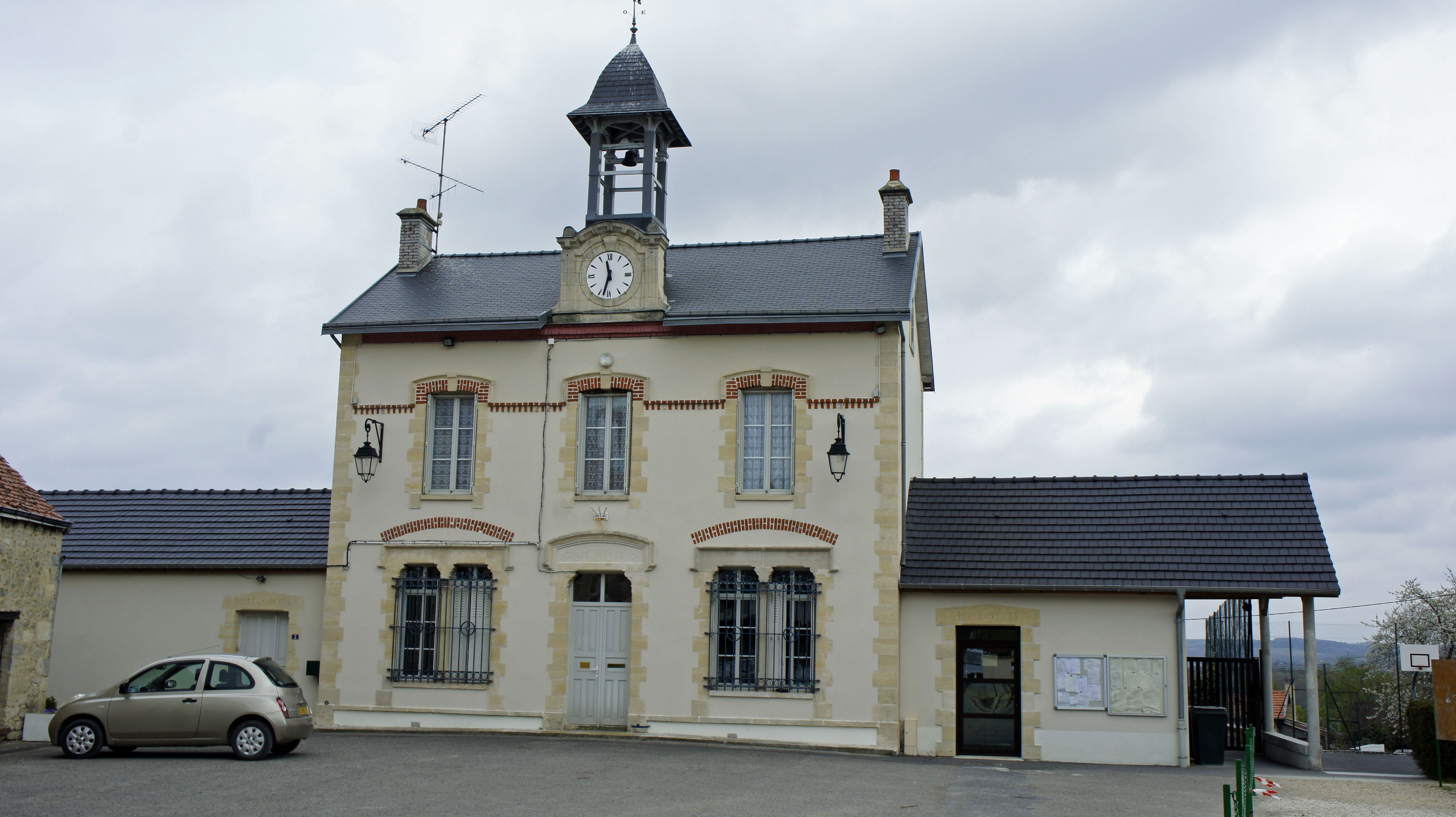
- The town hall in Branscourt
- Location of Branscourt
- Location within France Location within Grand Est
- Coordinates: 49°16′14″N 3°49′20″E
- Country: France
- Region: Grand Est
- Department: Marne
- Arrondissement: Reims
- Canton: Fismes-Montagne de Reims
- Intercommunality: CU Grand Reims

Government
  - Mayor (2020–2026): Pierre Lhotte
- Area^{1}: 3.72 km^{2} (1.44 sq mi)
- Elevation: 81 m (266 ft)
- Population (2023): 308
  - Density: 82.8/km^{2} (214/sq mi)
- Time zone: UTC+01:00 (CET)
  - Summer (DST): UTC+02:00 (CEST)
- INSEE/Postal code: 51081 /51140
- ^{1} French Land Register data, which excludes lakes, ponds, glaciers > 1 km^{2} (0.386 sq mi or 247 acres) and river estuaries.

Branscourt is a commune in the Marne department in northeastern France.

== Population ==
Historical population
Year	Pop.	±% p.a.
1968	173	—
1975	146	−2.39%
1982	158	+1.13%
1990	231	+4.86%
1999	260	+1.32%
2007	244	−0.79%
2012	266	+1.74%
2017	309	+3.04%
2023	308	−0.05%
Source: INSEE

== See also ==
- Communes of the Marne department
