= Trigny =

- Commune
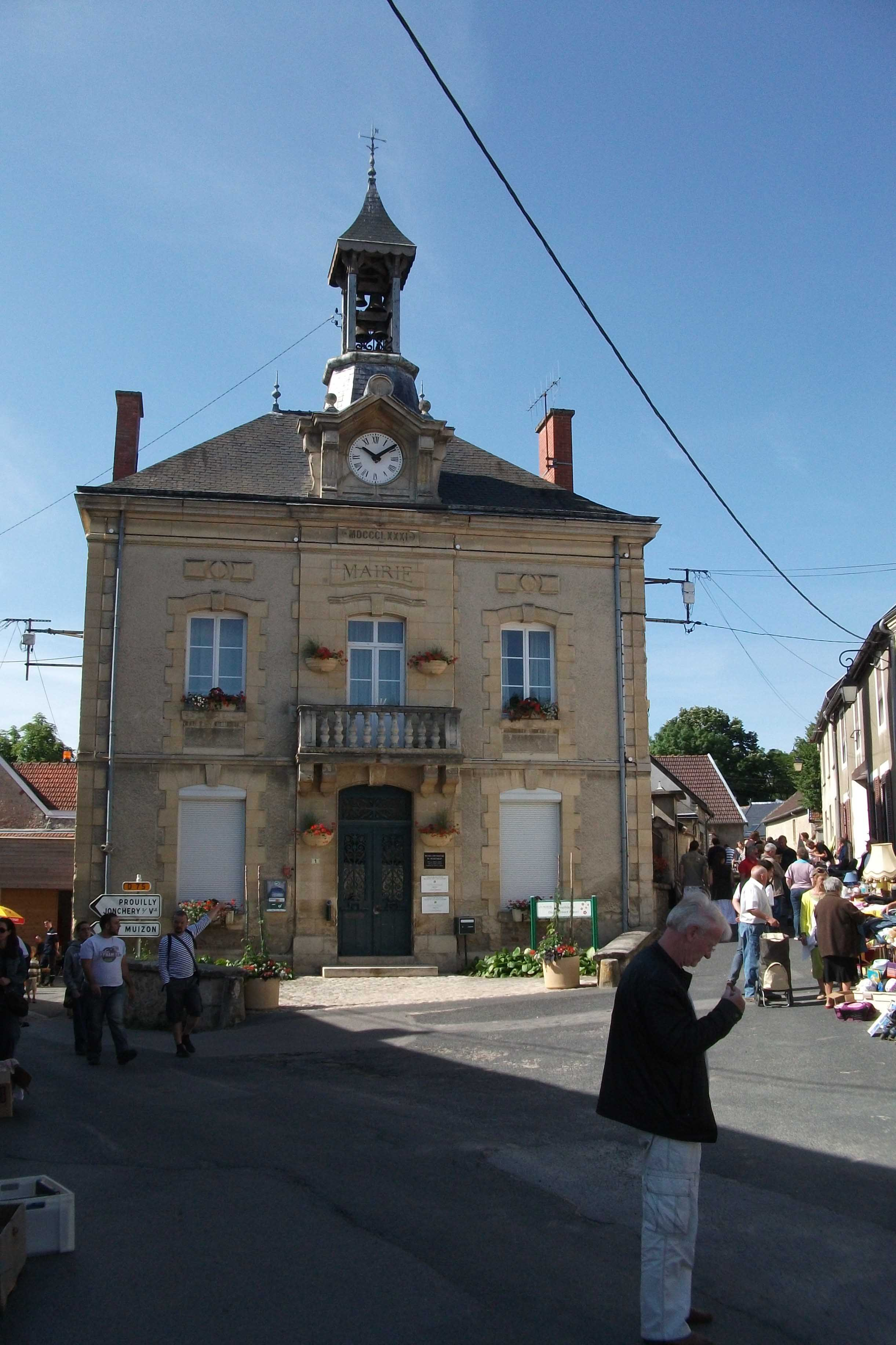
- The town hall in Trigny

- Coat of arms
- Location of Trigny
- Location within France Location within Grand Est
- Coordinates: 49°18′11″N 3°53′47″E
- Country: France
- Region: Grand Est
- Department: Marne
- Arrondissement: Reims
- Canton: Fismes-Montagne de Reims
- Intercommunality: CU Grand Reims

Government
  - Mayor (2020–2026): Francis Blin
- Area^{1}: 12.21 km^{2} (4.71 sq mi)
- Elevation: 120 m (390 ft)
- Highest elevation: 215 m (705 ft)
- Lowest elevation: 68 m (223 ft)
- Population (2023): 619
  - Density: 50.7/km^{2} (131/sq mi)
- Demonym: Trigniciens
- Time zone: UTC+01:00 (CET)
  - Summer (DST): UTC+02:00 (CEST)
- INSEE/Postal code: 51582 /51140
- ^{1} French Land Register data, which excludes lakes, ponds, glaciers > 1 km^{2} (0.386 sq mi or 247 acres) and river estuaries.

Trigny (French pronunciation: [tʁiɲi]) is a commune in the Marne department in north-eastern France.

== See also ==
- Communes of the Marne department
