= Prouilly =

- Commune
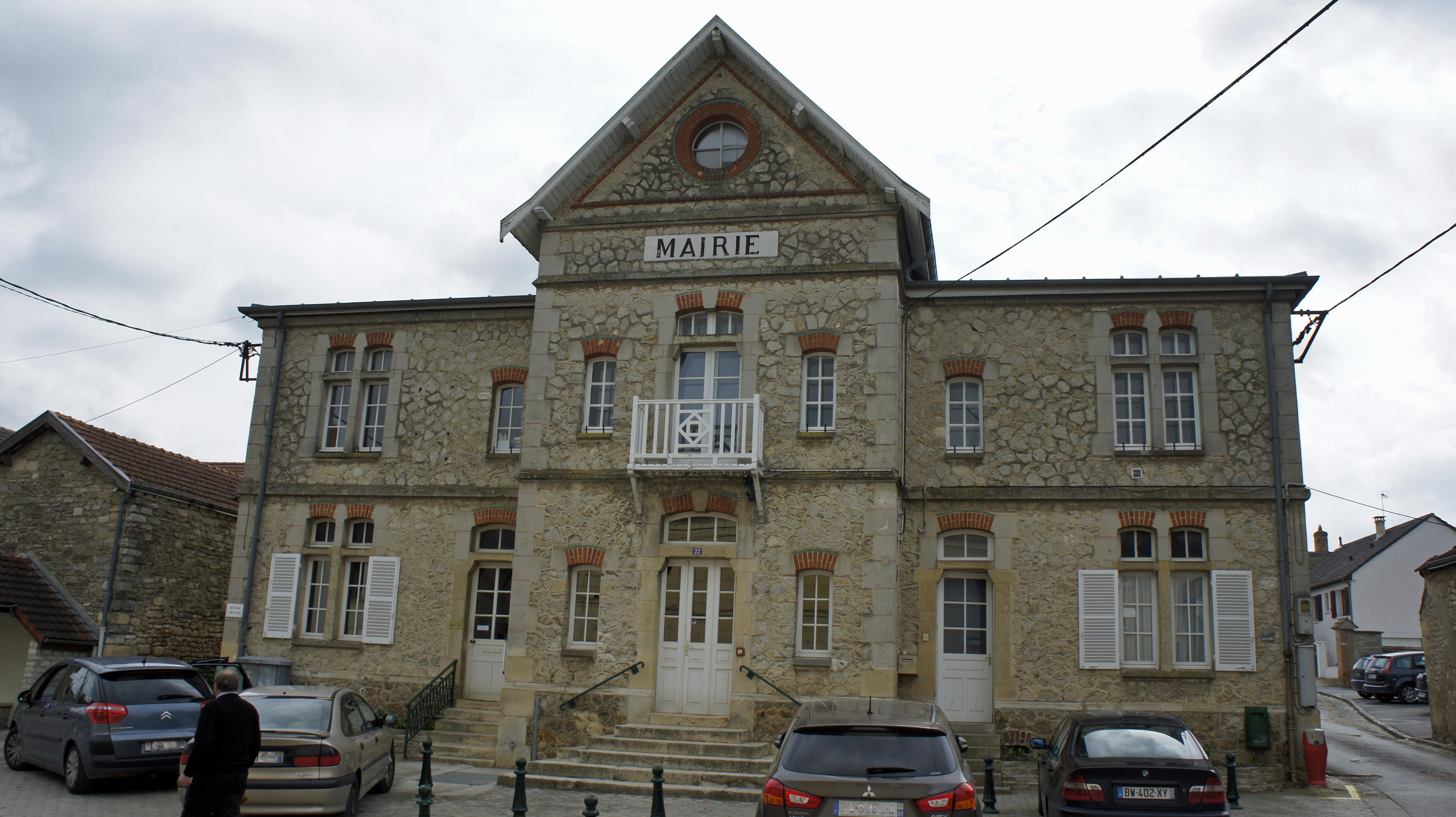
- The town hall in Prouilly
- Location of Prouilly
- Location within France Location within Grand Est
- Coordinates: 49°18′00″N 3°51′06″E
- Country: France
- Region: Grand Est
- Department: Marne
- Arrondissement: Reims
- Canton: Fismes-Montagne de Reims
- Intercommunality: CU Grand Reims

Government
  - Mayor (2020–2026): Catherine Malaisé
- Area^{1}: 10.19 km^{2} (3.93 sq mi)
- Elevation: 138 m (453 ft)
- Highest elevation: 210 m (690 ft)
- Lowest elevation: 66 m (217 ft)
- Population (2023): 549
  - Density: 53.9/km^{2} (140/sq mi)
- Time zone: UTC+01:00 (CET)
  - Summer (DST): UTC+02:00 (CEST)
- INSEE/Postal code: 51448 /51140
- ^{1} French Land Register data, which excludes lakes, ponds, glaciers > 1 km^{2} (0.386 sq mi or 247 acres) and river estuaries.

Prouilly (French pronunciation: [pʁuji]) is a commune in the Marne department in north-eastern France.

== See also ==
- Communes of the Marne department
