= Vandeuil =

- Commune
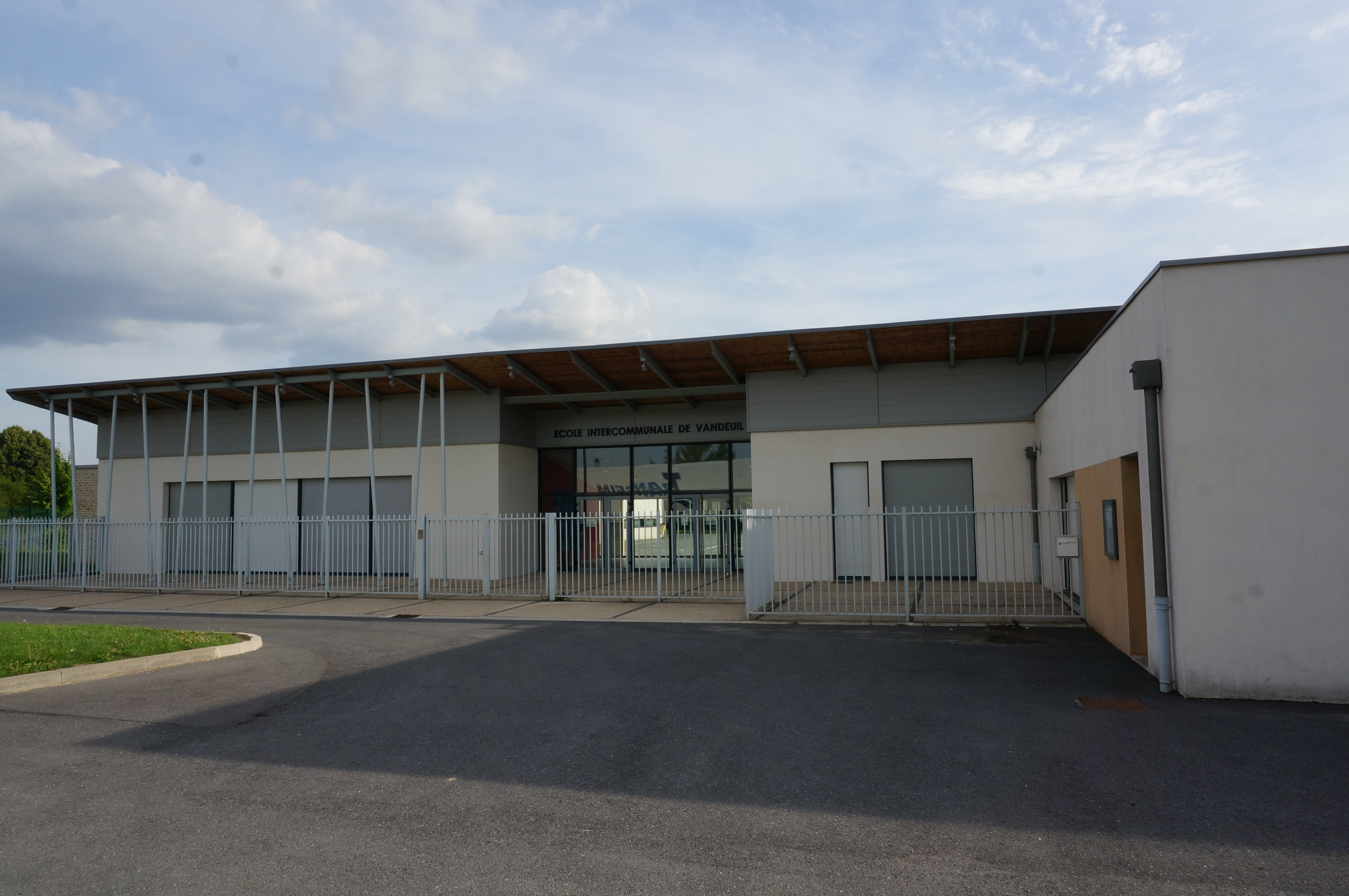
- The school in Vandeuil
- Location of Vandeuil
- Location within France Location within Grand Est
- Coordinates: 49°16′50″N 3°47′36″E
- Country: France
- Region: Grand Est
- Department: Marne
- Arrondissement: Reims
- Canton: Fismes-Montagne de Reims
- Intercommunality: CU Grand Reims

Government
  - Mayor (2020–2026): François Mourra
- Area^{1}: 5.35 km^{2} (2.07 sq mi)
- Elevation: 180 m (590 ft)
- Population (2023): 187
  - Density: 35.0/km^{2} (90.5/sq mi)
- Time zone: UTC+01:00 (CET)
  - Summer (DST): UTC+02:00 (CEST)
- INSEE/Postal code: 51591 /51140
- ^{1} French Land Register data, which excludes lakes, ponds, glaciers > 1 km^{2} (0.386 sq mi or 247 acres) and river estuaries.

Vandeuil (French pronunciation: [vɑ̃dœj]) is a commune in Marne, a department in northeastern France.

== See also ==
- Communes of the Marne department
