= Courmas =

- Commune
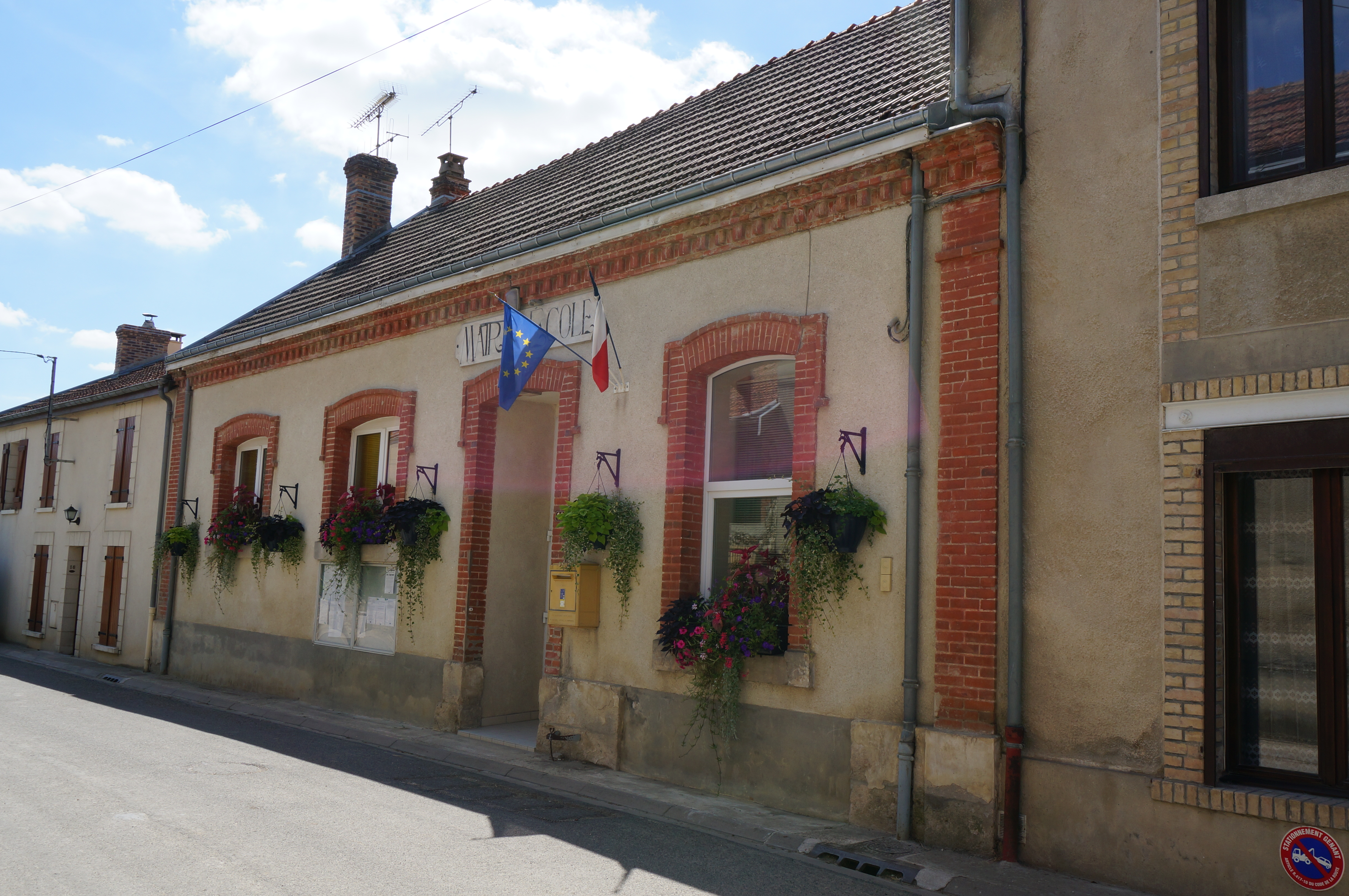
- The town hall in Courmas

- Coat of arms
- Location of Courmas
- Location within France Location within Grand Est
- Coordinates: 49°11′24″N 3°54′34″E
- Country: France
- Region: Grand Est
- Department: Marne
- Arrondissement: Reims
- Canton: Fismes-Montagne de Reims
- Intercommunality: CU Grand Reims

Government
  - Mayor (2020–2026): Jean-Robert Auguste
- Area^{1}: 2.87 km^{2} (1.11 sq mi)
- Highest elevation: 253 m (830 ft)
- Lowest elevation: 158 m (518 ft)
- Population (2023): 237
  - Density: 82.6/km^{2} (214/sq mi)
- Time zone: UTC+01:00 (CET)
  - Summer (DST): UTC+02:00 (CEST)
- INSEE/Postal code: 51188 /51390
- ^{1} French Land Register data, which excludes lakes, ponds, glaciers > 1 km^{2} (0.386 sq mi or 247 acres) and river estuaries.

Courmas (French pronunciation: [kuʁma]) is a commune in the Marne department in north-eastern France.

== See also ==
- Communes of the Marne department
- Montagne de Reims Regional Natural Park
