= Jouy-lès-Reims =

- Commune
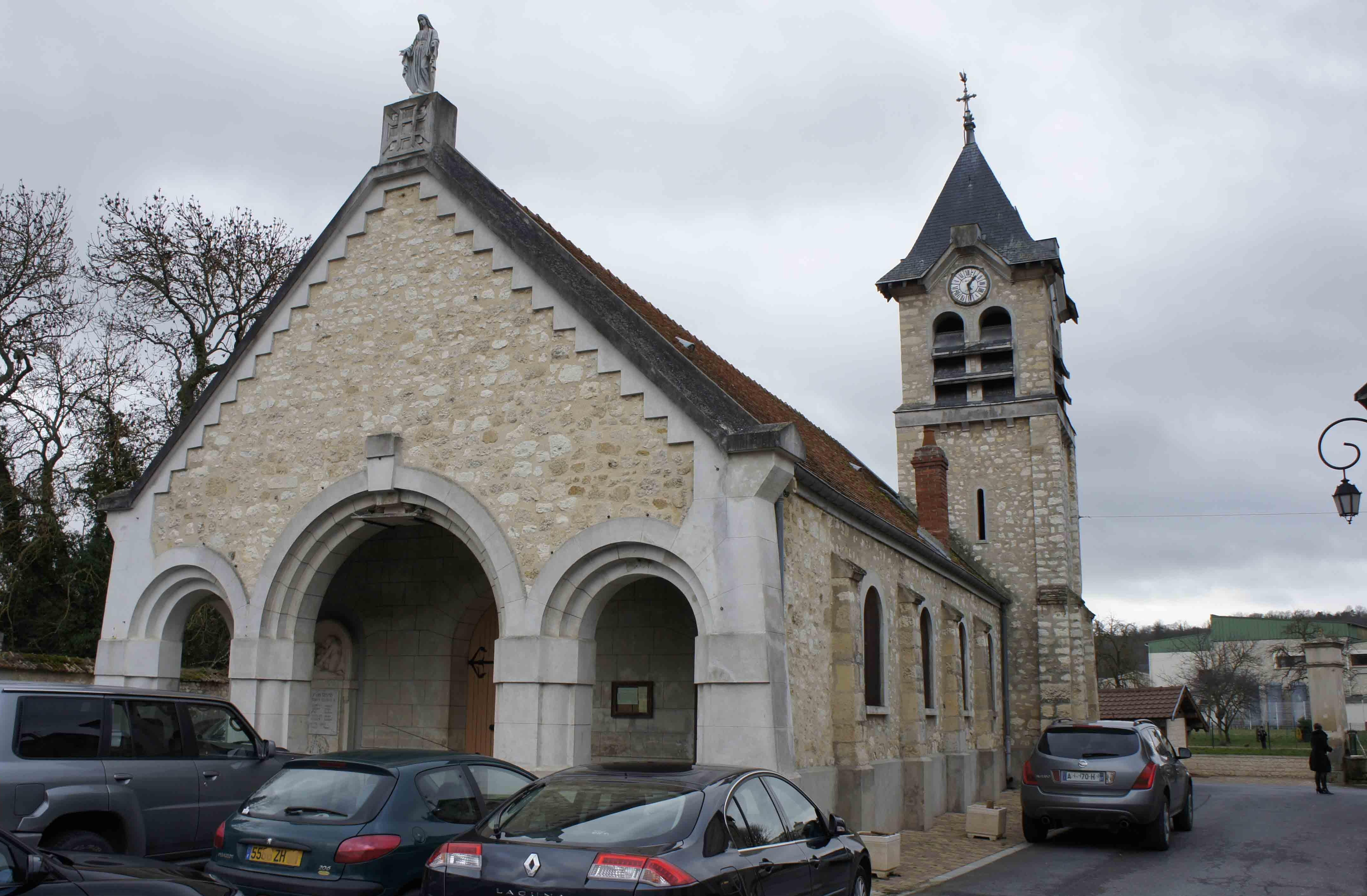
- The church in Jouy-lès-Reims
- Location of Jouy-lès-Reims
- Location within France Location within Grand Est
- Coordinates: 49°12′58″N 3°55′47″E
- Country: France
- Region: Grand Est
- Department: Marne
- Arrondissement: Reims
- Canton: Fismes-Montagne de Reims
- Intercommunality: CU Grand Reims

Government
  - Mayor (2020–2026): Sylvie Poret
- Area^{1}: 1.86 km^{2} (0.72 sq mi)
- Elevation: 112 m (367 ft)
- Population (2023): 204
  - Density: 110/km^{2} (284/sq mi)
- Time zone: UTC+01:00 (CET)
  - Summer (DST): UTC+02:00 (CEST)
- INSEE/Postal code: 51310 /51390
- ^{1} French Land Register data, which excludes lakes, ponds, glaciers > 1 km^{2} (0.386 sq mi or 247 acres) and river estuaries.

Jouy-lès-Reims (French pronunciation: [ʒwi lɛ ʁɛ̃s], literally Jouy near Reims) is a commune in the Marne department of north-eastern France.

== See also ==
- Communes of the Marne department
- Montagne de Reims Regional Natural Park
