= Romain, Marne =

Romain
- Commune
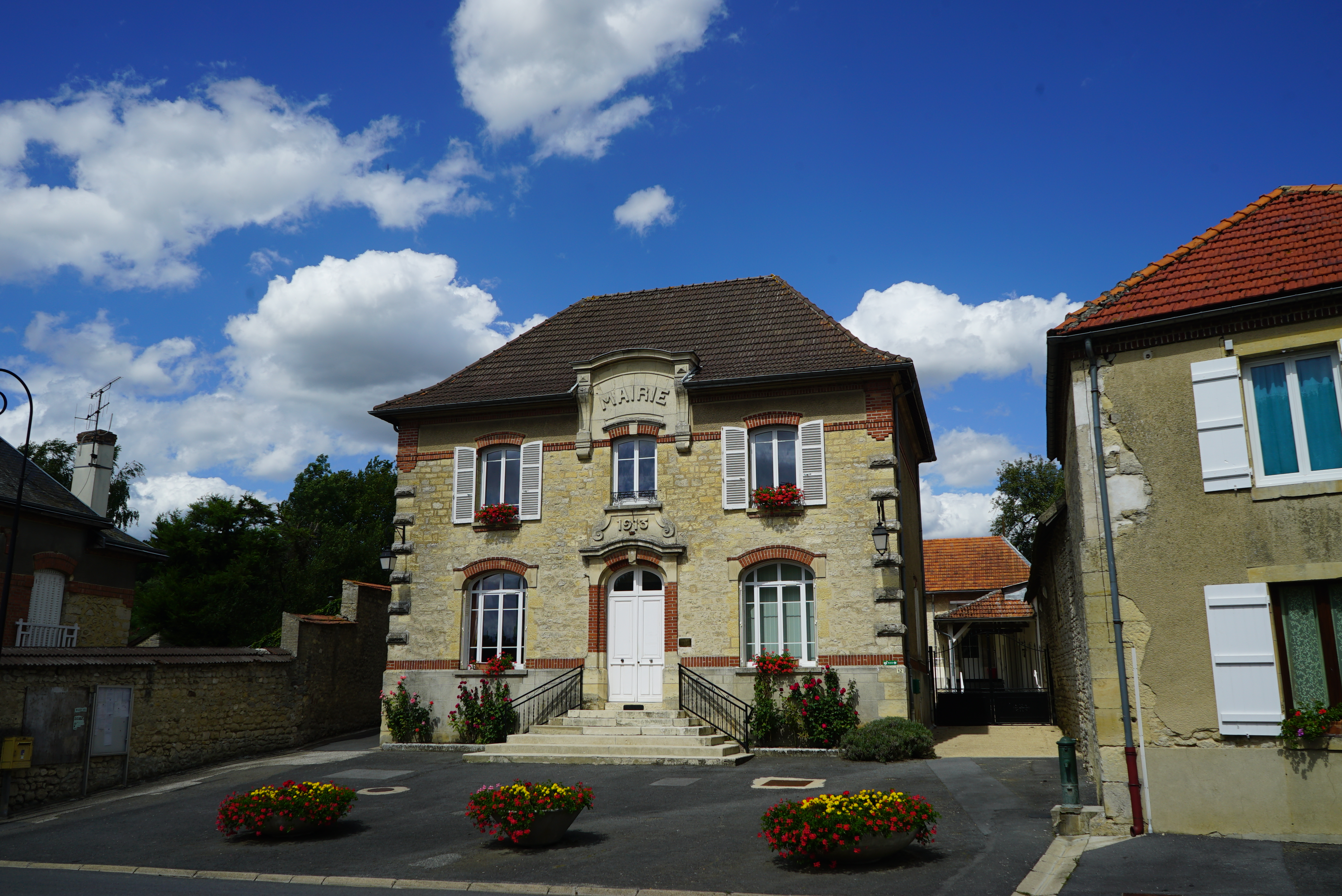
- The town hall in Romain
- Location of Romain
- Location within France Location within Grand Est
- Coordinates: 49°19′52″N 3°46′17″E
- Country: France
- Region: Grand Est
- Department: Marne
- Arrondissement: Reims
- Canton: Fismes-Montagne de Reims
- Intercommunality: CU Grand Reims

Government
  - Mayor (2020–2026): Pascal Harlaut
- Area^{1}: 8.46 km^{2} (3.27 sq mi)
- Elevation: 100 m (330 ft)
- Population (2023): 332
  - Density: 39.2/km^{2} (102/sq mi)
- Time zone: UTC+01:00 (CET)
  - Summer (DST): UTC+02:00 (CEST)
- INSEE/Postal code: 51464 /51140
- ^{1} French Land Register data, which excludes lakes, ponds, glaciers > 1 km^{2} (0.386 sq mi or 247 acres) and river estuaries.

Romain (French pronunciation: [ʁɔmɛ̃]) is a commune in the Marne department in north-eastern France.

The village was destroyed during World War I and was awarded the Croix de guerre 1914–1918 (France) on May 30, 1921.

== See also ==
- Communes of the Marne department
