= Saint-Euphraise-et-Clairizet =

- Commune
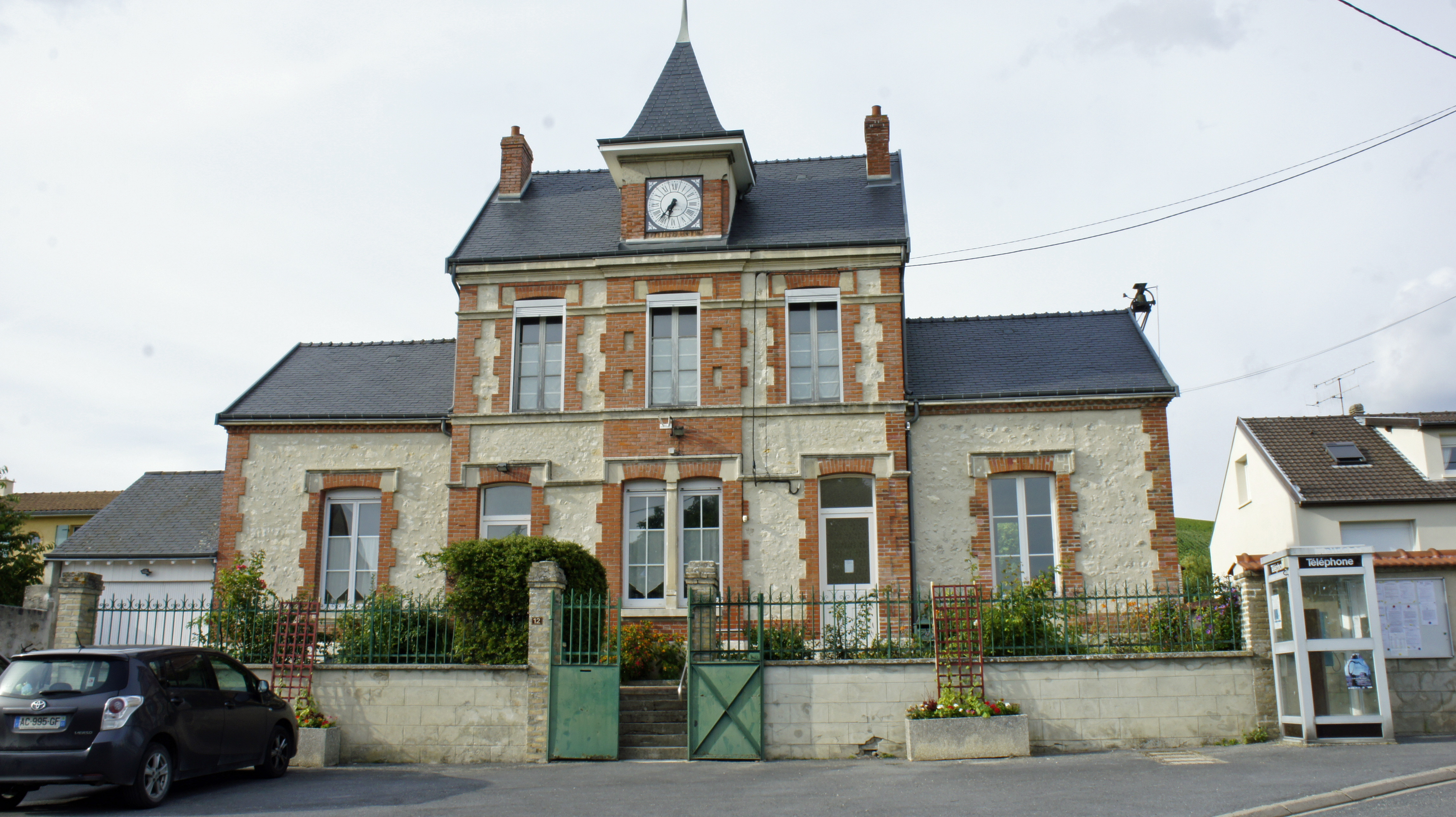
- The town hall in Saint-Euphraise-et-Clairizet
- Location of Saint-Euphraise-et-Clairizet
- Location within France Location within Grand Est
- Coordinates: 49°12′47″N 3°53′14″E
- Country: France
- Region: Grand Est
- Department: Marne
- Arrondissement: Reims
- Canton: Fismes-Montagne de Reims
- Intercommunality: CU Grand Reims

Government
  - Mayor (2020–2026): Jean-Pierre Arnaud
- Area^{1}: 4.91 km^{2} (1.90 sq mi)
- Elevation: 117 m (384 ft)
- Population (2023): 244
  - Density: 49.7/km^{2} (129/sq mi)
- Time zone: UTC+01:00 (CET)
  - Summer (DST): UTC+02:00 (CEST)
- INSEE/Postal code: 51479 /51390
- ^{1} French Land Register data, which excludes lakes, ponds, glaciers > 1 km^{2} (0.386 sq mi or 247 acres) and river estuaries.

Saint-Euphraise-et-Clairizet (French pronunciation: [sɛ̃.t‿øfʁɛz e klɛʁizɛ]) is a commune in the Marne département in north-eastern France.

At the time of the French Revolution, the commune was called Ardrecours.

== See also ==
- Communes of the Marne department
- Montagne de Reims Regional Natural Park
