= Coulommes-la-Montagne =

- Commune
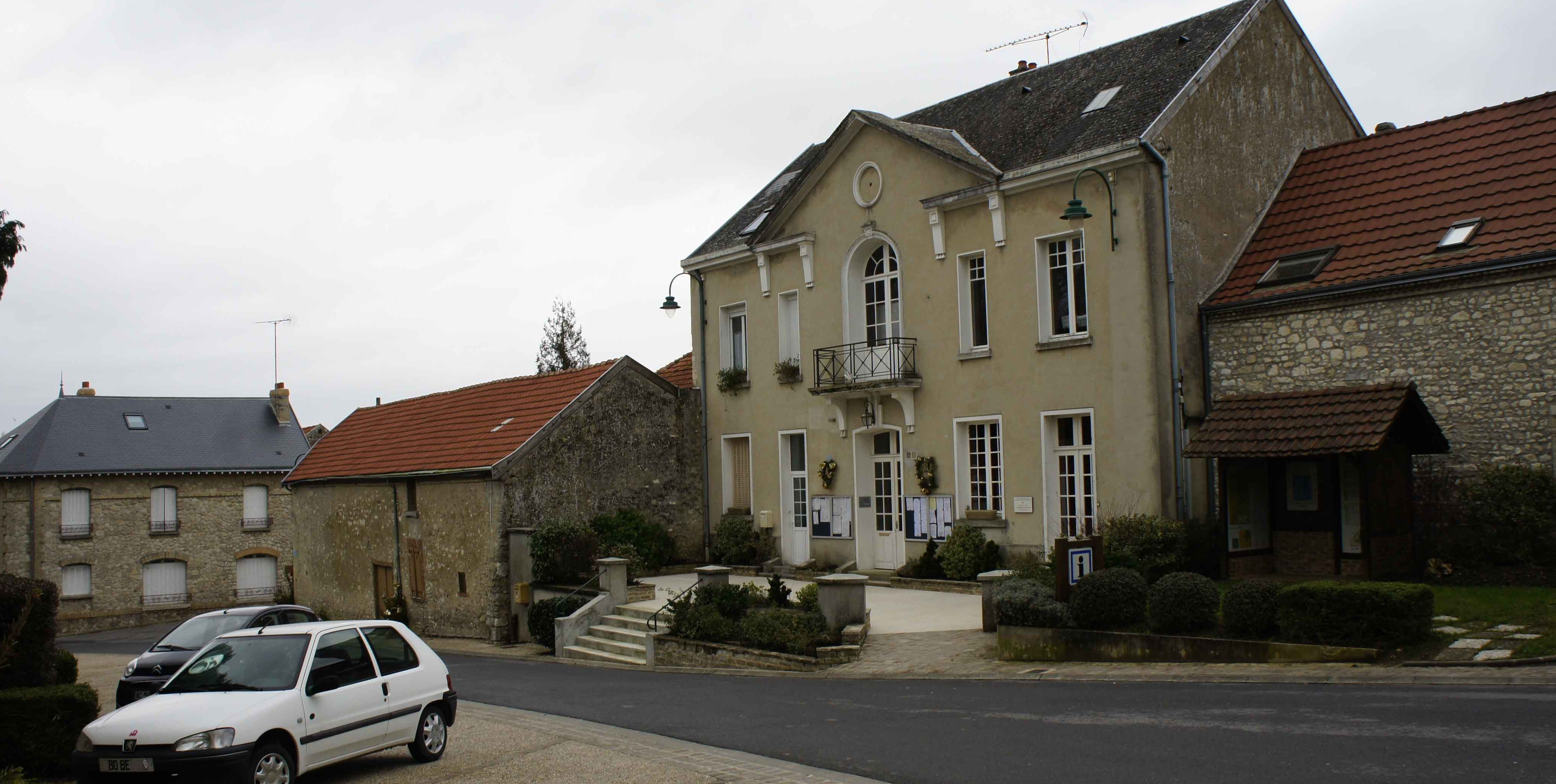
- The town hall in Coulommes-la-Montagne
- Location of Coulommes-la-Montagne
- Location within France Location within Grand Est
- Coordinates: 49°13′35″N 3°54′41″E
- Country: France
- Region: Grand Est
- Department: Marne
- Arrondissement: Reims
- Canton: Fismes-Montagne de Reims
- Intercommunality: CU Grand Reims

Government
  - Mayor (2020–2026): Julien Lepitre
- Area^{1}: 2.7 km^{2} (1.0 sq mi)
- Elevation: 145 m (476 ft)
- Population (2023): 209
  - Density: 77/km^{2} (200/sq mi)
- Time zone: UTC+01:00 (CET)
  - Summer (DST): UTC+02:00 (CEST)
- INSEE/Postal code: 51177 /51390
- ^{1} French Land Register data, which excludes lakes, ponds, glaciers > 1 km^{2} (0.386 sq mi or 247 acres) and river estuaries.

Coulommes-la-Montagne (French pronunciation: [kulɔm la mɔ̃taɲ]) is a commune in the Marne department in north-eastern France.

== See also ==
- Communes of the Marne department
- Montagne de Reims Regional Natural Park
