= Pargny-lès-Reims =

- Commune
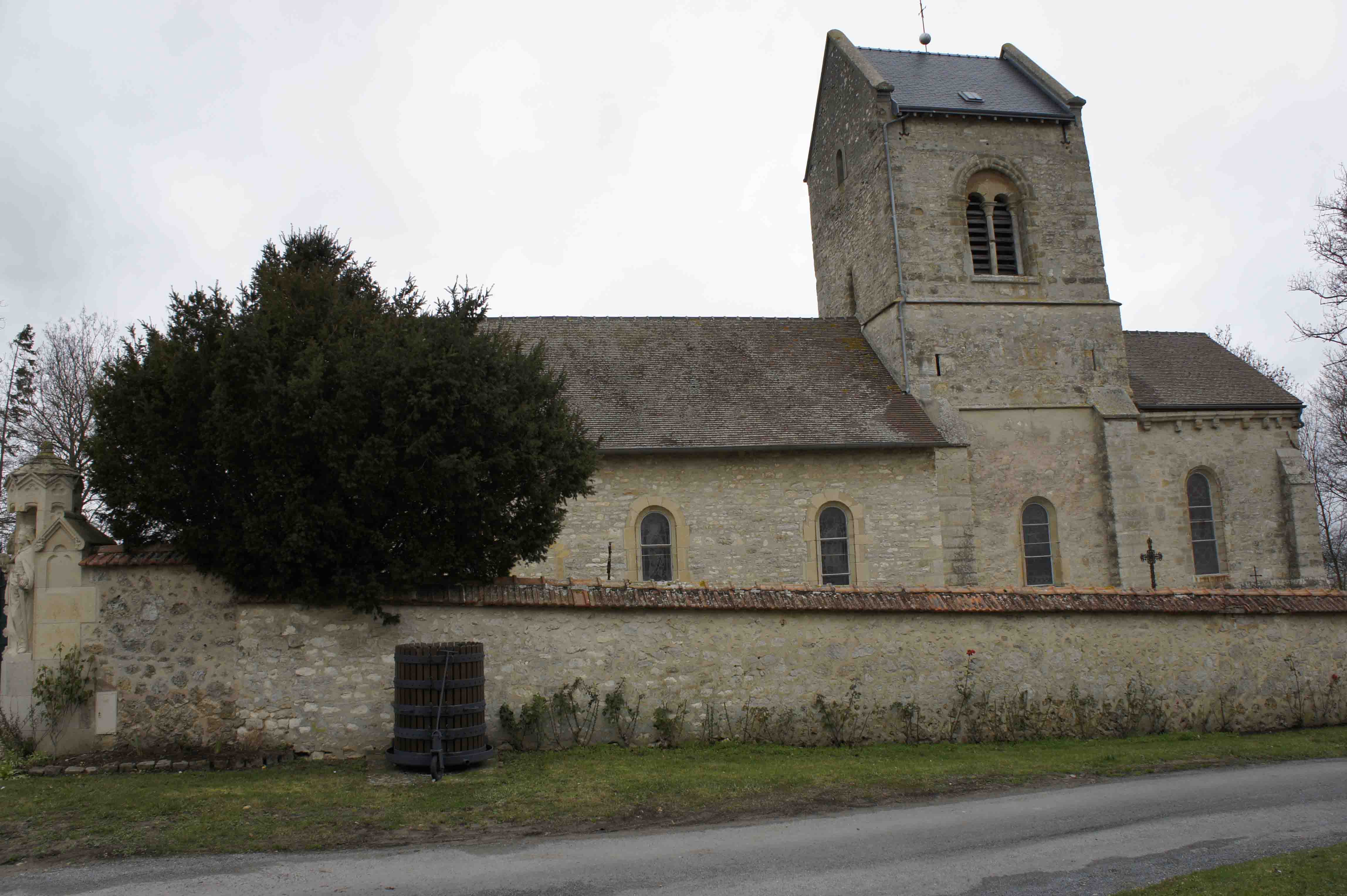
- The church in Pargny-lès-Reims
- Location of Pargny-lès-Reims
- Location within France Location within Grand Est
- Coordinates: 49°13′13″N 3°55′37″E
- Country: France
- Region: Grand Est
- Department: Marne
- Arrondissement: Reims
- Canton: Fismes-Montagne de Reims
- Intercommunality: CU Grand Reims

Government
  - Mayor (2020–2026): Robert d'Harcourt
- Area^{1}: 3.62 km^{2} (1.40 sq mi)
- Elevation: 138 m (453 ft)
- Population (2023): 497
  - Density: 137/km^{2} (356/sq mi)
- Time zone: UTC+01:00 (CET)
  - Summer (DST): UTC+02:00 (CEST)
- INSEE/Postal code: 51422 /51390
- ^{1} French Land Register data, which excludes lakes, ponds, glaciers > 1 km^{2} (0.386 sq mi or 247 acres) and river estuaries.

Pargny-lès-Reims (French pronunciation: [paʁɲi lɛ ʁɛ̃s], literally Pargny near Reims) is a commune in the Marne department in north-eastern France.

== See also ==
- Communes of the Marne department
- Montagne de Reims Regional Natural Park

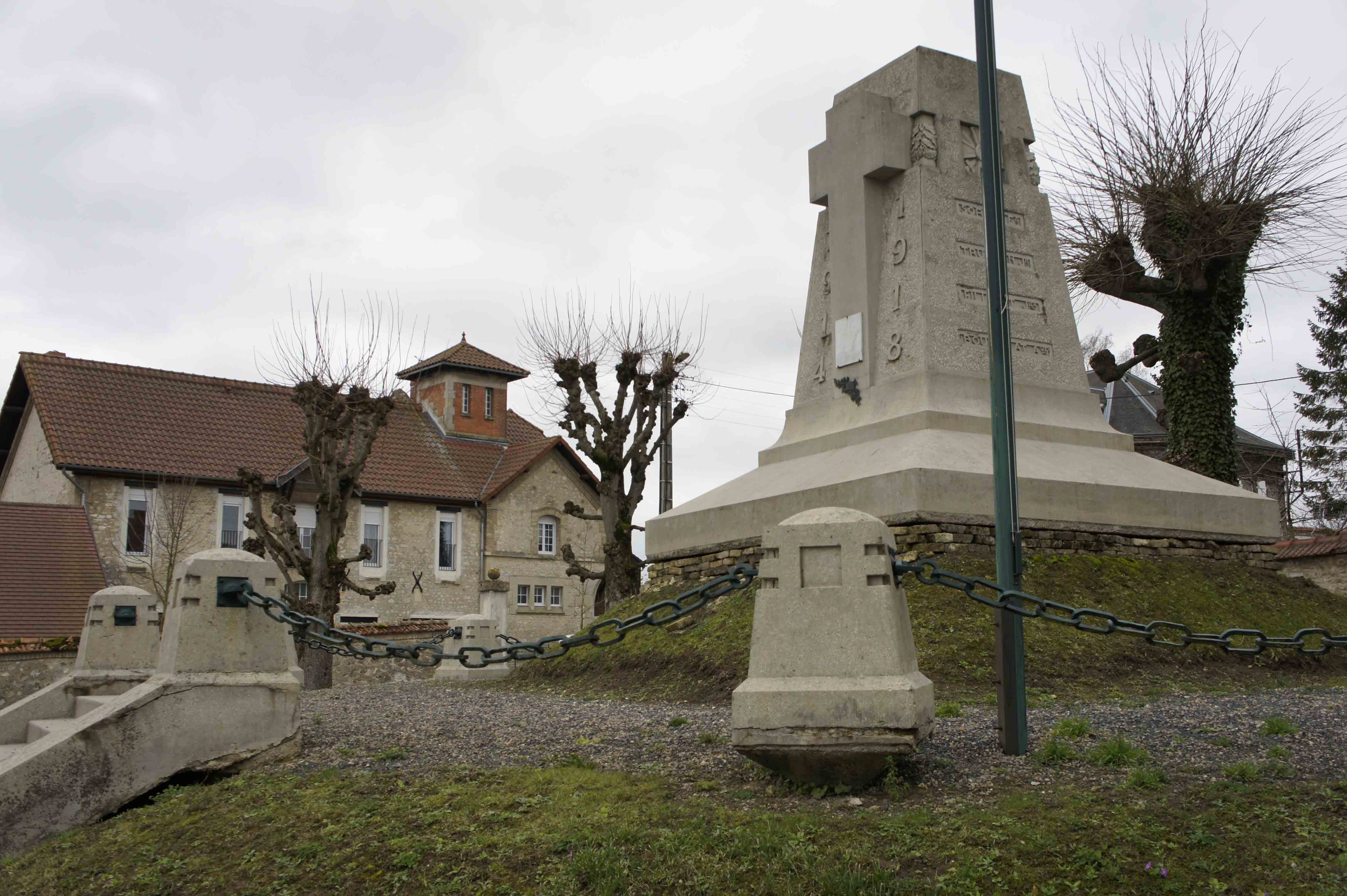
War memorials.
