= Ventelay =

- Commune
- Location of Ventelay
- Location within France Location within Grand Est
- Coordinates: 49°20′30″N 3°47′58″E
- Country: France
- Region: Grand Est
- Department: Marne
- Arrondissement: Reims
- Canton: Fismes-Montagne de Reims
- Intercommunality: CU Grand Reims

Government
  - Mayor (2020–2026): Marcel Vergez
- Area^{1}: 14.74 km^{2} (5.69 sq mi)
- Elevation: 89 m (292 ft)
- Population (2023): 253
  - Density: 17.2/km^{2} (44.5/sq mi)
- Time zone: UTC+01:00 (CET)
  - Summer (DST): UTC+02:00 (CEST)
- INSEE/Postal code: 51604 /51140
- ^{1} French Land Register data, which excludes lakes, ponds, glaciers > 1 km^{2} (0.386 sq mi or 247 acres) and river estuaries.

Ventelay (French pronunciation: [vɑ̃tlɛ]) is a commune in the Marne department in north-eastern France.

== See also ==
- Communes of the Marne department
