= Sermiers =

- Commune
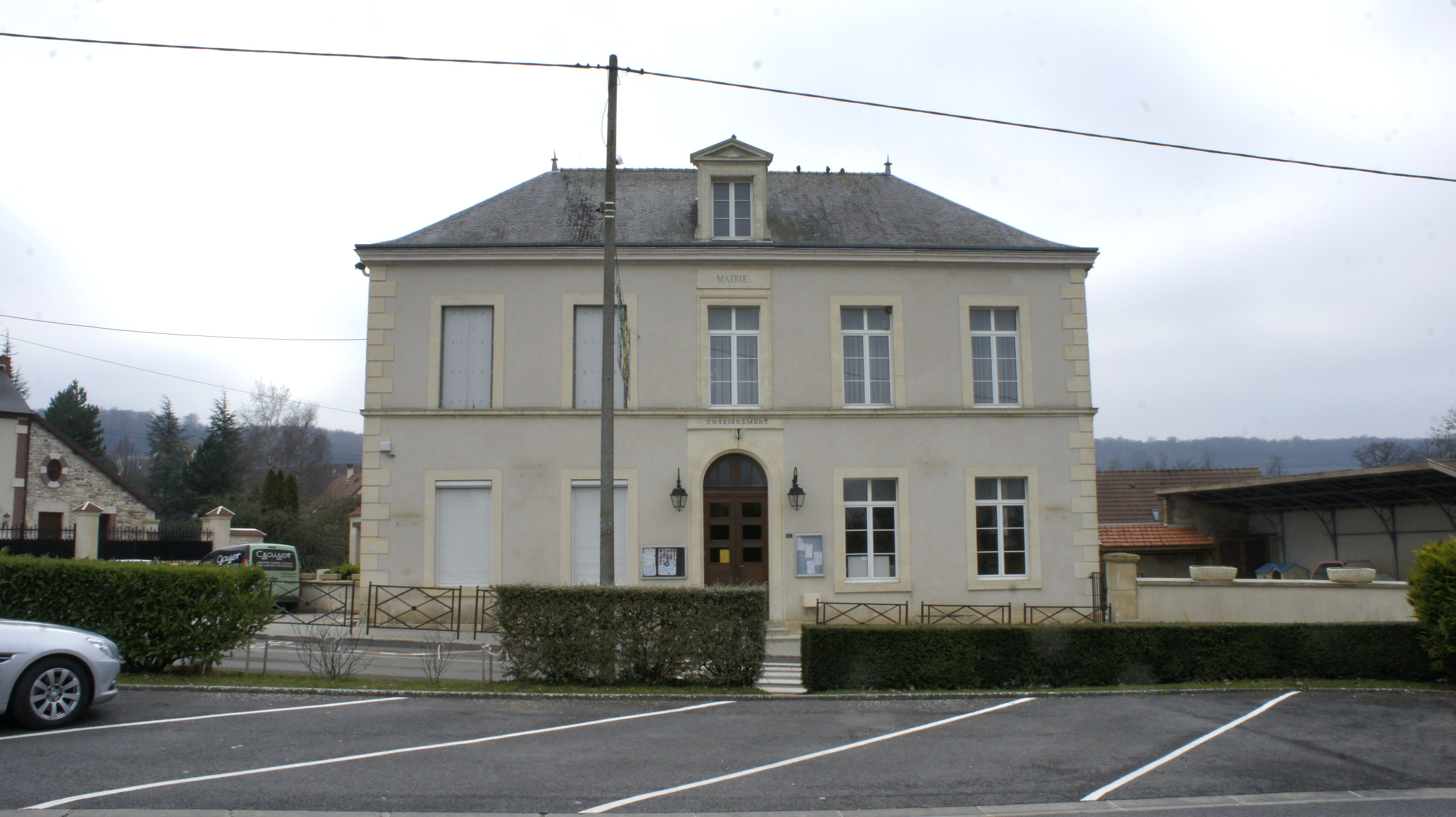
- The town hall in Sermiers

- Coat of arms
- Location of Sermiers
- Location within France Location within Grand Est
- Coordinates: 49°09′33″N 3°59′09″E
- Country: France
- Region: Grand Est
- Department: Marne
- Arrondissement: Reims
- Canton: Fismes-Montagne de Reims
- Intercommunality: CU Grand Reims

Government
  - Mayor (2020–2026): Christophe Patinet
- Area^{1}: 18.23 km^{2} (7.04 sq mi)
- Highest elevation: 273 m (896 ft)
- Lowest elevation: 118 m (387 ft)
- Population (2023): 564
  - Density: 30.9/km^{2} (80.1/sq mi)
- Time zone: UTC+01:00 (CET)
  - Summer (DST): UTC+02:00 (CEST)
- INSEE/Postal code: 51532 /51500
- ^{1} French Land Register data, which excludes lakes, ponds, glaciers > 1 km^{2} (0.386 sq mi or 247 acres) and river estuaries.

Sermiers (French pronunciation: [sɛʁmje]) is a commune in the Marne department in north-eastern France.

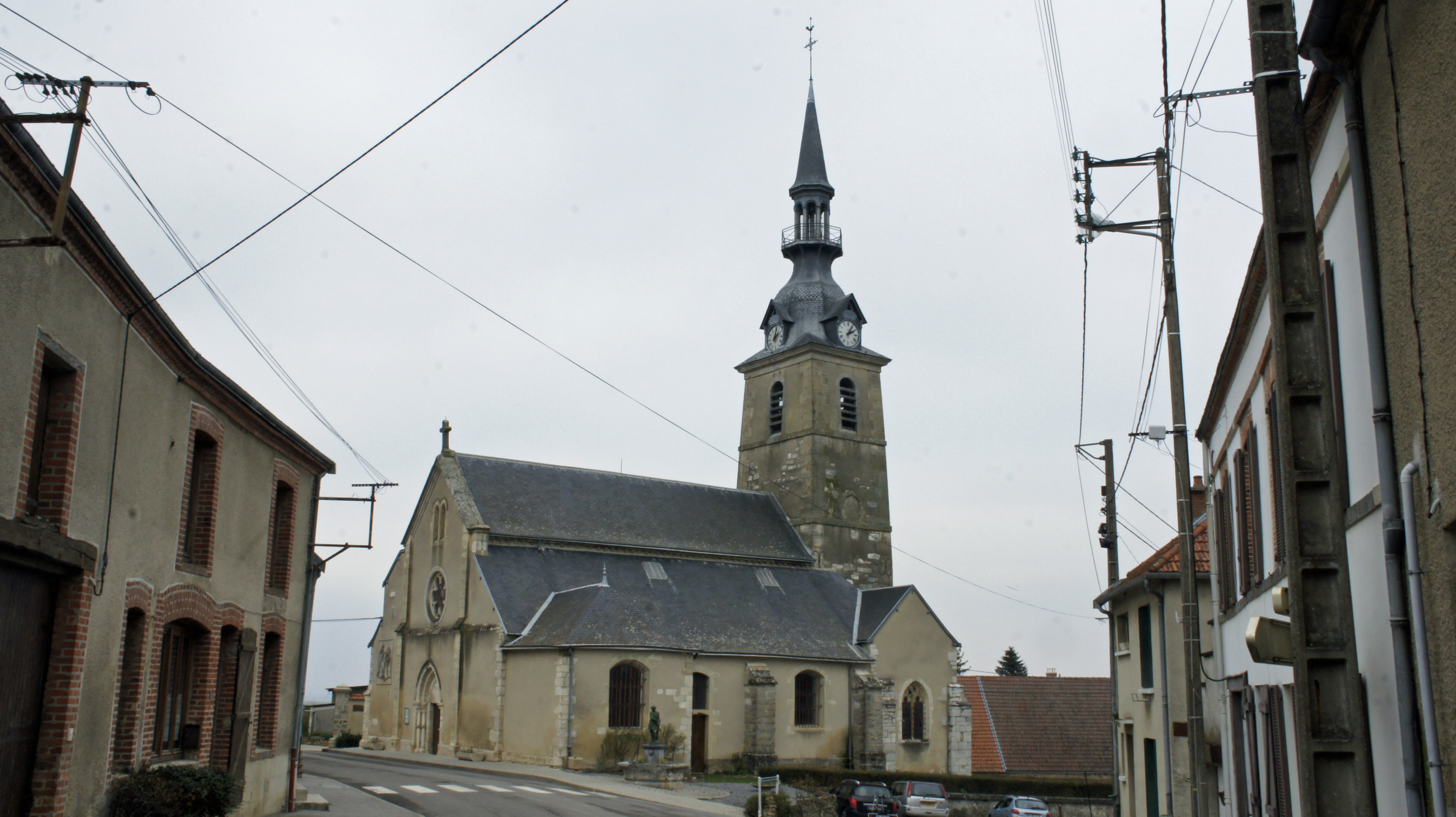
Church

== See also ==
- Communes of the Marne department
- Montagne de Reims Regional Natural Park
