= Écueil =

- Commune
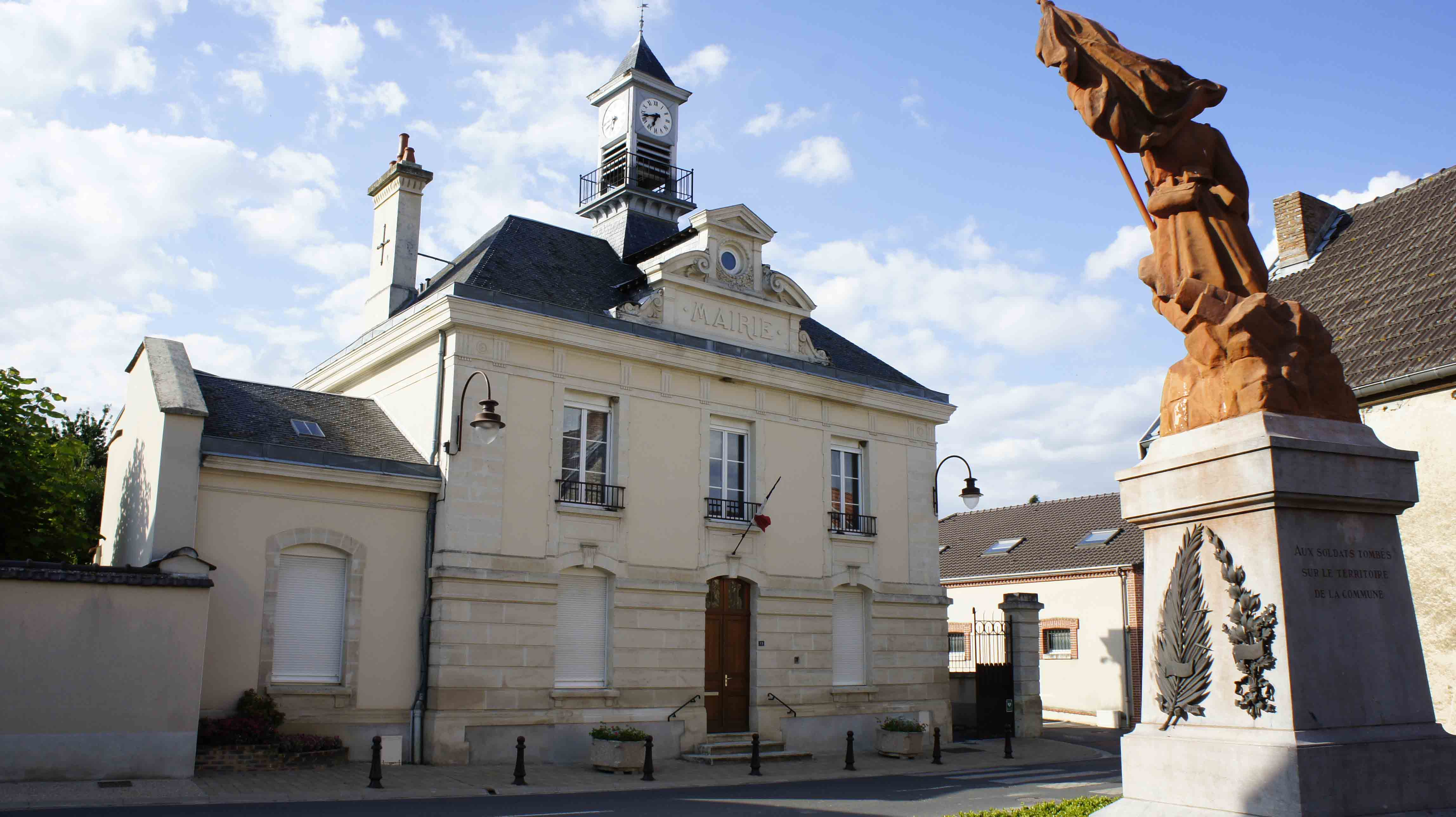
- The town hall in Écueil
- Location of Écueil
- Location within France Location within Grand Est
- Coordinates: 49°11′13″N 3°57′13″E
- Country: France
- Region: Grand Est
- Department: Marne
- Arrondissement: Reims
- Canton: Fismes-Montagne de Reims
- Intercommunality: CU Grand Reims

Government
  - Mayor (2020–2026): Annie Perrard
- Area^{1}: 7.03 km^{2} (2.71 sq mi)
- Elevation: 150 m (490 ft)
- Population (2023): 358
  - Density: 50.9/km^{2} (132/sq mi)
- Time zone: UTC+01:00 (CET)
  - Summer (DST): UTC+02:00 (CEST)
- INSEE/Postal code: 51225 /51500
- ^{1} French Land Register data, which excludes lakes, ponds, glaciers > 1 km^{2} (0.386 sq mi or 247 acres) and river estuaries.

Écueil (French pronunciation: [ekœj]) is a commune in the Marne department in north-eastern France.

== See also ==
- Communes of the Marne department
- Montagne de Reims Regional Natural Park

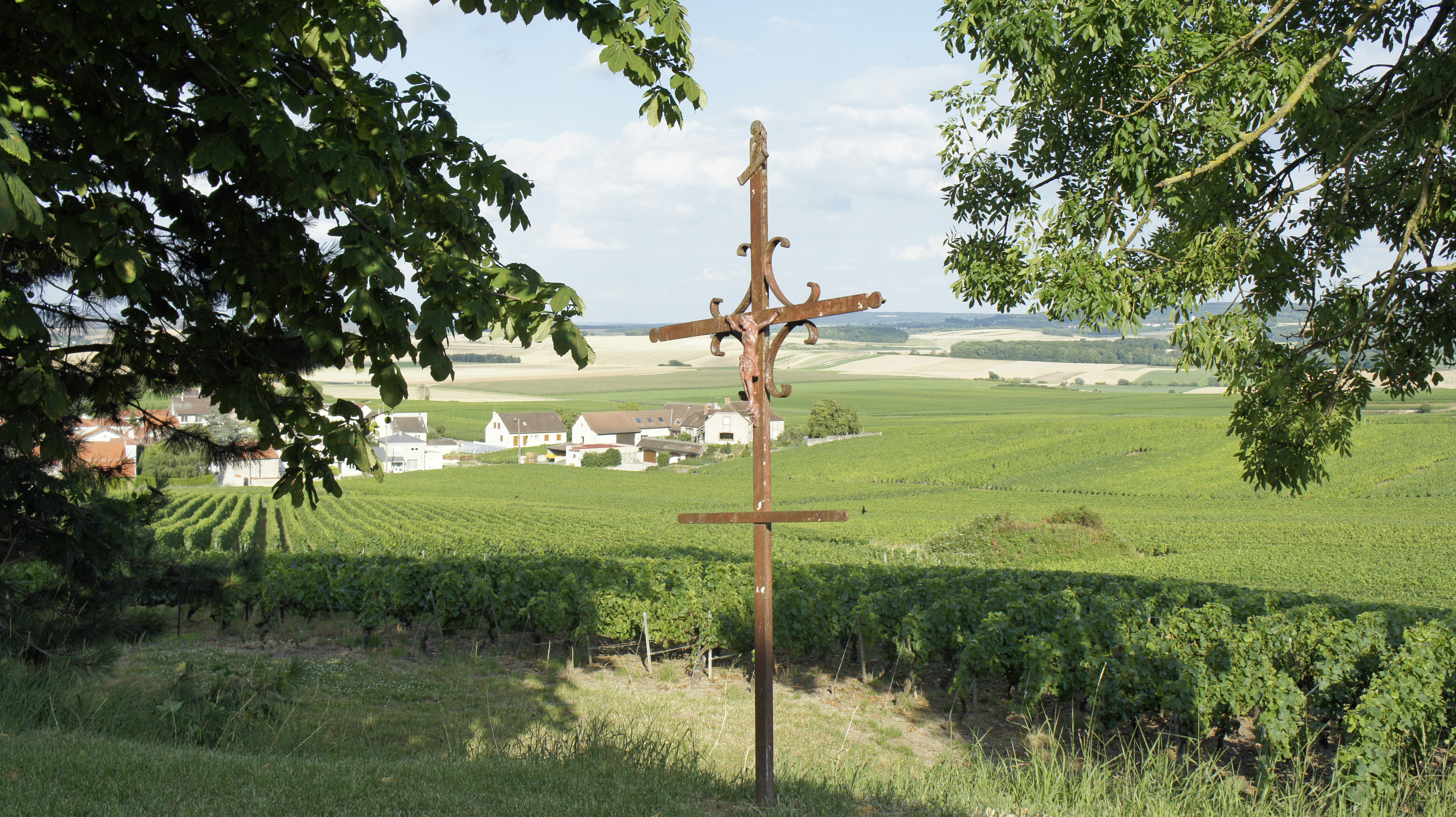
