= Courcelles-Sapicourt =

- Commune
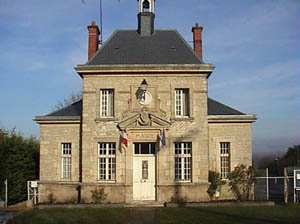
- The town hall in Courcelles Sapicourt
- Location of Courcelles-Sapicourt
- Location within France Location within Grand Est
- Coordinates: 49°15′45″N 3°50′42″E
- Country: France
- Region: Grand Est
- Department: Marne
- Arrondissement: Reims
- Canton: Fismes-Montagne de Reims
- Intercommunality: CU Grand Reims

Government
  - Mayor (2020–2026): Jean Michel
- Area^{1}: 3.86 km^{2} (1.49 sq mi)
- Elevation: 95 m (312 ft)
- Population (2023): 396
  - Density: 103/km^{2} (266/sq mi)
- Time zone: UTC+01:00 (CET)
  - Summer (DST): UTC+02:00 (CEST)
- INSEE/Postal code: 51181 /51140
- ^{1} French Land Register data, which excludes lakes, ponds, glaciers > 1 km^{2} (0.386 sq mi or 247 acres) and river estuaries.

Courcelles-Sapicourt (French pronunciation: [kuʁsɛl sapikuʁ]) is a commune in the Marne department in north-eastern France.

== See also ==
- Communes of the Marne department
