= Faverolles-et-Coëmy =

- Commune
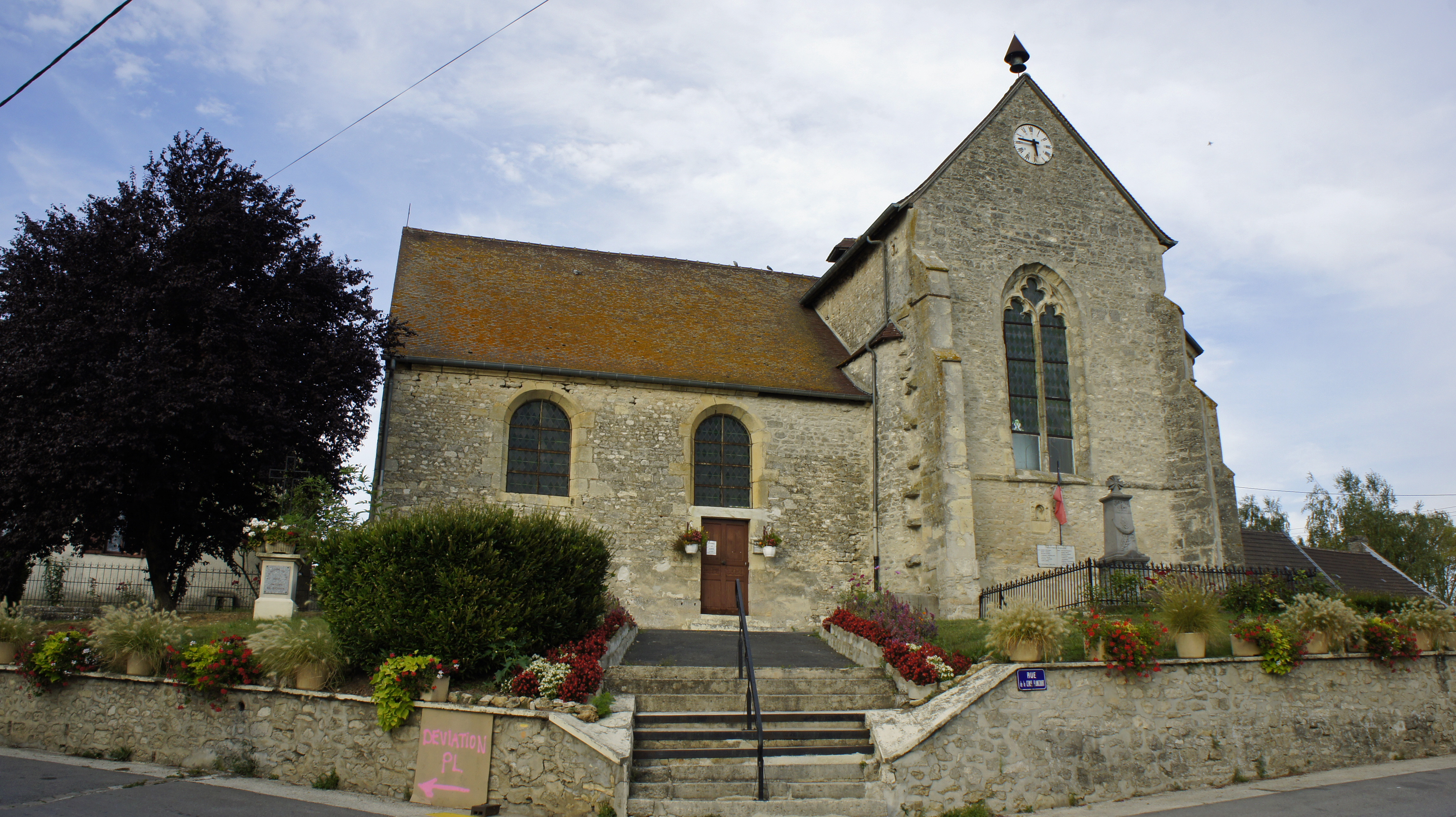
- The church in Faverolles-et-Coëmy

- Coat of arms
- Location of Faverolles-et-Coëmy
- Location within France Location within Grand Est
- Coordinates: 49°14′09″N 3°47′37″E
- Country: France
- Region: Grand Est
- Department: Marne
- Arrondissement: Reims
- Canton: Fismes-Montagne de Reims
- Intercommunality: CU Grand Reims

Government
  - Mayor (2020–2026): Alain Michelon
- Area^{1}: 5.48 km^{2} (2.12 sq mi)
- Elevation: 86 m (282 ft)
- Population (2023): 601
  - Density: 110/km^{2} (284/sq mi)
- Time zone: UTC+01:00 (CET)
  - Summer (DST): UTC+02:00 (CEST)
- INSEE/Postal code: 51245 /51170
- ^{1} French Land Register data, which excludes lakes, ponds, glaciers > 1 km^{2} (0.386 sq mi or 247 acres) and river estuaries.

Faverolles-et-Coëmy (French pronunciation: [favʁɔl e kɔɛmi]) is a commune in the Marne department in north-eastern France.

== See also ==
- Communes of the Marne department
