= Courtagnon =

- Commune
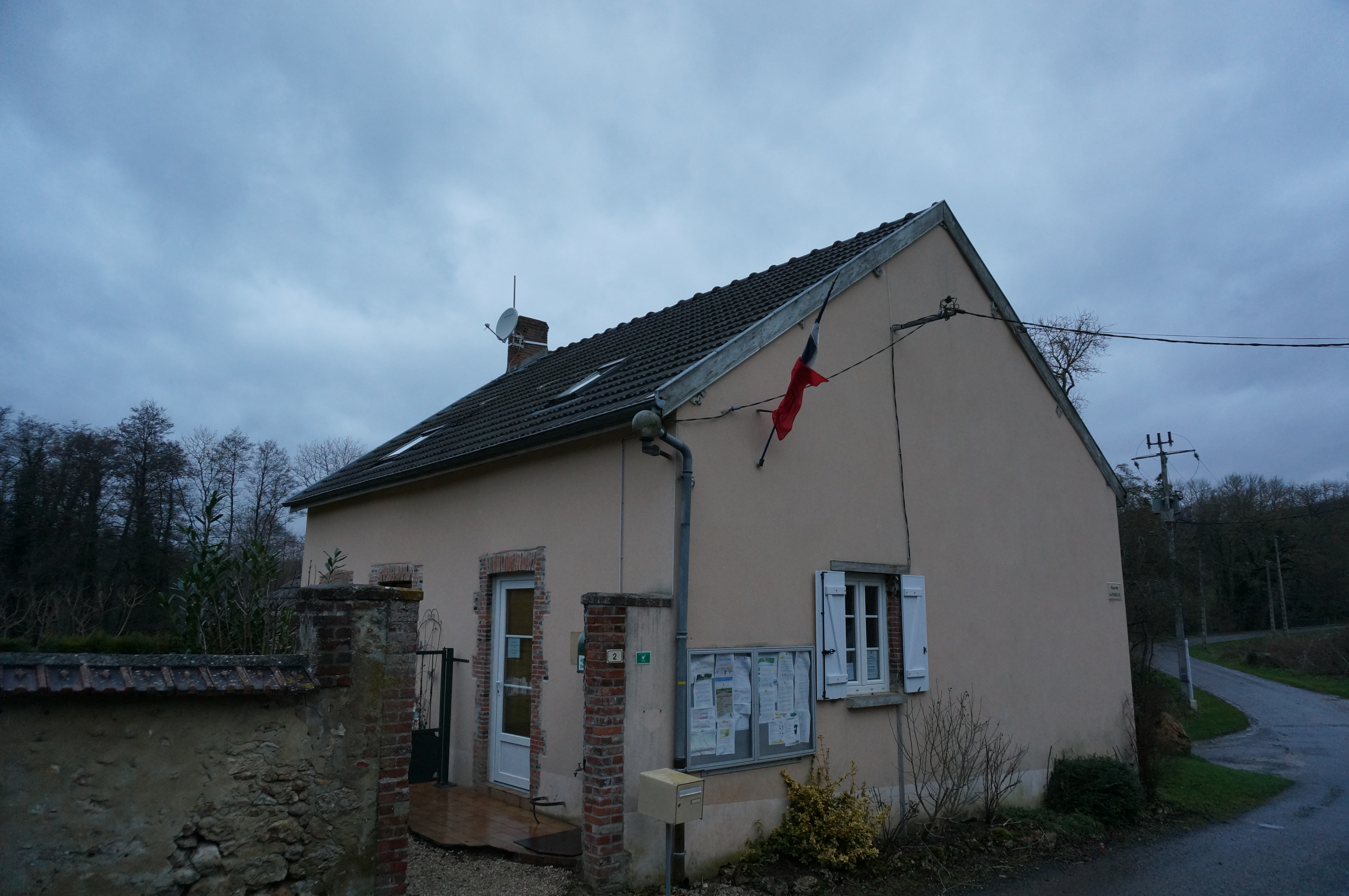
- The town hall in Courtagnon
- Location of Courtagnon
- Location within France Location within Grand Est
- Coordinates: 49°08′43″N 3°56′49″E
- Country: France
- Region: Grand Est
- Department: Marne
- Arrondissement: Reims
- Canton: Fismes-Montagne de Reims
- Intercommunality: CU Grand Reims

Government
  - Mayor (2020–2026): Valérie Cordebar
- Area^{1}: 3.95 km^{2} (1.53 sq mi)
- Elevation: 180 m (590 ft)
- Population (2023): 77
  - Density: 19/km^{2} (50/sq mi)
- Time zone: UTC+01:00 (CET)
  - Summer (DST): UTC+02:00 (CEST)
- INSEE/Postal code: 51190 /51480
- ^{1} French Land Register data, which excludes lakes, ponds, glaciers > 1 km^{2} (0.386 sq mi or 247 acres) and river estuaries.

Courtagnon (French pronunciation: [kuʁtaɲɔ̃]) is a commune in the Marne department in north-eastern France.

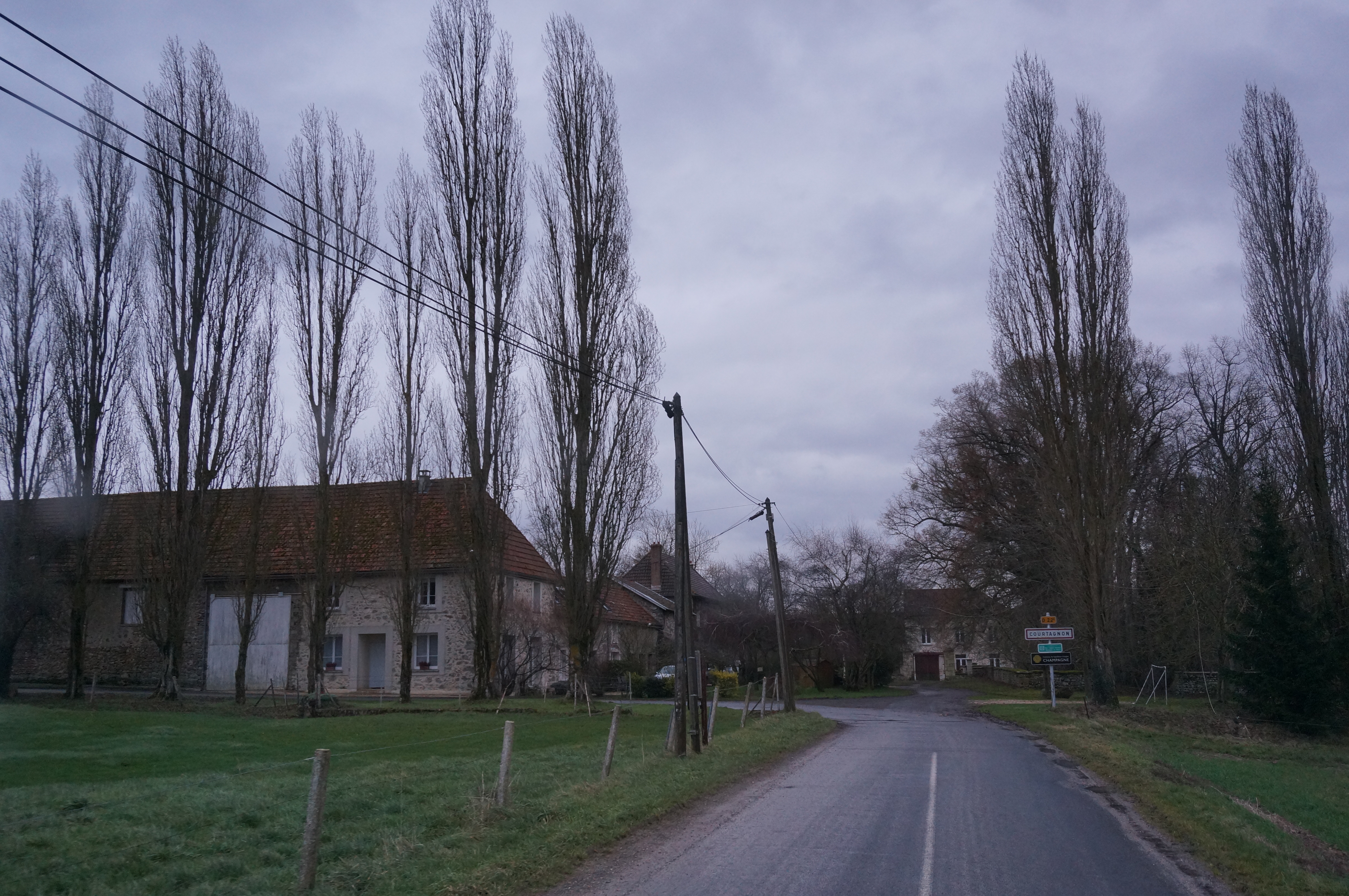

== See also ==
- Communes of the Marne department
- Montagne de Reims Regional Natural Park
