= Montigny-sur-Vesle =

- Commune
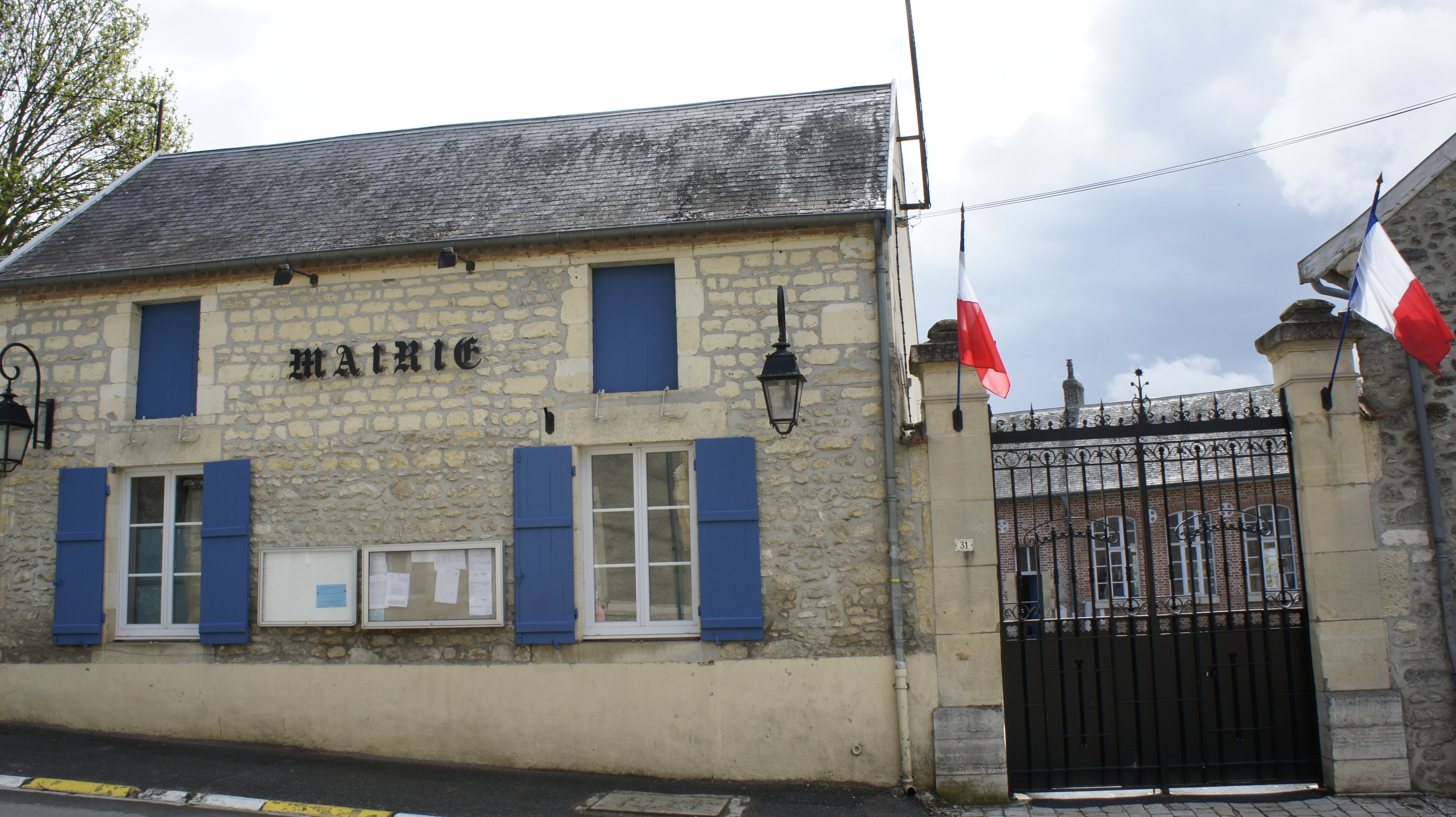
- The town hall in Montigny-sur-Vesle

- Coat of arms
- Location of Montigny-sur-Vesle
- Location within France Location within Grand Est
- Coordinates: 49°18′49″N 3°48′08″E
- Country: France
- Region: Grand Est
- Department: Marne
- Arrondissement: Reims
- Canton: Fismes-Montagne de Reims
- Intercommunality: CU Grand Reims

Government
  - Mayor (2020–2026): Christophe Blot
- Area^{1}: 9.46 km^{2} (3.65 sq mi)
- Highest elevation: 202 m (663 ft)
- Lowest elevation: 64 m (210 ft)
- Population (2023): 569
  - Density: 60.1/km^{2} (156/sq mi)
- Demonym: Ignymontois
- Time zone: UTC+01:00 (CET)
  - Summer (DST): UTC+02:00 (CEST)
- INSEE/Postal code: 51379 /51140
- ^{1} French Land Register data, which excludes lakes, ponds, glaciers > 1 km^{2} (0.386 sq mi or 247 acres) and river estuaries.

Montigny-sur-Vesle (French pronunciation: [mɔ̃tiɲi syʁ vɛl], literally Montigny on Vesle) is a commune in the Marne department in north-eastern France.

== See also ==
- Communes of the Marne department
