= Canton of Fismes-Montagne de Reims =

Coordinates: 49.31°N 3.68°E

The canton of Fismes-Montagne de Reims is an administrative division of the Marne department, northeastern France. It was created at the French canton reorganisation which came into effect in March 2015. Its seat is in Fismes.

It consists of the following communes:

1. Arcis-le-Ponsart
2. Aubilly
3. Baslieux-lès-Fismes
4. Bouilly
5. Bouleuse
6. Bouvancourt
7. Branscourt
8. Breuil-sur-Vesle
9. Châlons-sur-Vesle
10. Chamery
11. Chenay
12. Coulommes-la-Montagne
13. Courcelles-Sapicourt
14. Courlandon
15. Courmas
16. Courtagnon
17. Courville
18. Crugny
19. Écueil
20. Faverolles-et-Coëmy
21. Fismes
22. Germigny
23. Gueux
24. Hourges
25. Janvry
26. Jonchery-sur-Vesle
27. Jouy-lès-Reims
28. Magneux
29. Méry-Prémecy
30. Les Mesneux
31. Montigny-sur-Vesle
32. Mont-sur-Courville
33. Muizon
34. Ormes
35. Pargny-lès-Reims
36. Pévy
37. Prouilly
38. Romain
39. Rosnay
40. Sacy
41. Saint-Euphraise-et-Clairizet
42. Saint-Gilles
43. Savigny-sur-Ardres
44. Sermiers
45. Serzy-et-Prin
46. Thillois
47. Treslon
48. Trigny
49. Unchair
50. Vandeuil
51. Ventelay
52. Ville-Dommange
53. Vrigny
