= Aubilly =

- Commune
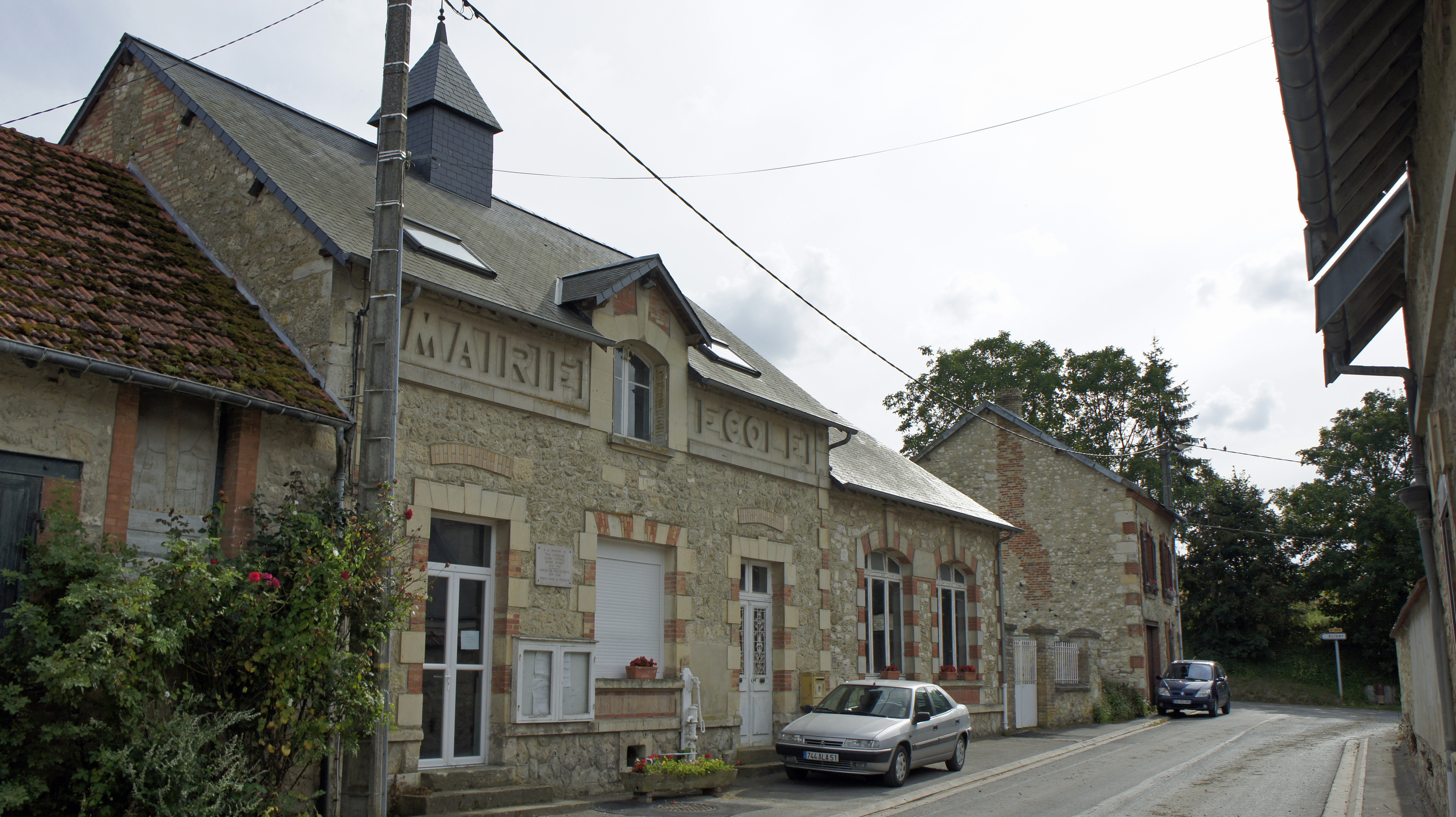
- The town hall in Aubilly
- Location of Aubilly
- Location within France Location within Grand Est
- Coordinates: 49°12′48″N 3°51′35″E
- Country: France
- Region: Grand Est
- Department: Marne
- Arrondissement: Reims
- Canton: Fismes-Montagne de Reims
- Intercommunality: CU Grand Reims

Government
  - Mayor (2020–2026): Bernard Thiéry
- Area^{1}: 3.16 km^{2} (1.22 sq mi)
- Highest elevation: 183 m (600 ft)
- Lowest elevation: 103 m (338 ft)
- Population (2023): 50
  - Density: 16/km^{2} (41/sq mi)
- Time zone: UTC+01:00 (CET)
  - Summer (DST): UTC+02:00 (CEST)
- INSEE/Postal code: 51020 /51170
- ^{1} French Land Register data, which excludes lakes, ponds, glaciers > 1 km^{2} (0.386 sq mi or 247 acres) and river estuaries.

Aubilly (French pronunciation: [obiji]) is a commune in the Marne department in northeastern France.

== Population ==
Historical population
Year	Pop.	±% p.a.
1968	43	—
1975	42	−0.34%
1982	54	+3.66%
1990	56	+0.46%
1999	53	−0.61%
2007	51	−0.48%
2012	47	−1.62%
2017	53	+2.43%
2023	50	−0.97%
Source: INSEE

== See also ==
- Communes of the Marne department
- Montagne de Reims Regional Natural Park
