= Serzy-et-Prin =

- Commune
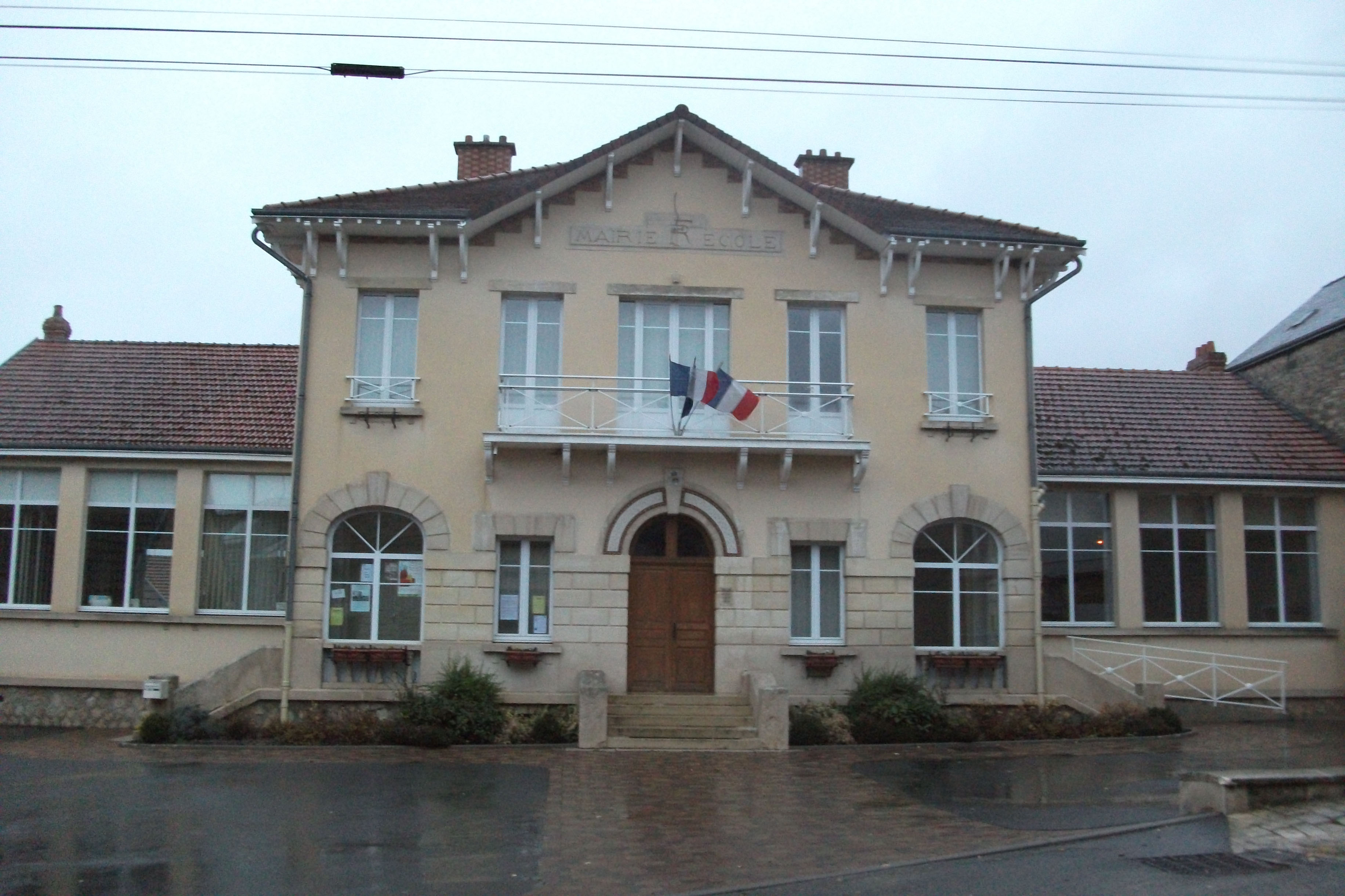
- The town hall in Serzy-et-Prin

- Coat of arms
- Location of Serzy-et-Prin
- Location within France Location within Grand Est
- Coordinates: 49°15′02″N 3°46′02″E
- Country: France
- Region: Grand Est
- Department: Marne
- Arrondissement: Reims
- Canton: Fismes-Montagne de Reims
- Intercommunality: CU Grand Reims

Government
  - Mayor (2020–2026): Franck Bailly
- Area^{1}: 7.36 km^{2} (2.84 sq mi)
- Elevation: 115 m (377 ft)
- Population (2023): 212
  - Density: 28.8/km^{2} (74.6/sq mi)
- Time zone: UTC+01:00 (CET)
  - Summer (DST): UTC+02:00 (CEST)
- INSEE/Postal code: 51534 /51170
- ^{1} French Land Register data, which excludes lakes, ponds, glaciers > 1 km^{2} (0.386 sq mi or 247 acres) and river estuaries.

Serzy-et-Prin (French pronunciation: [sɛʁzi e pʁɛ̃]) is a commune in the Marne department in north-eastern France.

== See also ==
- Communes of the Marne department
