= Courlandon =

- Commune
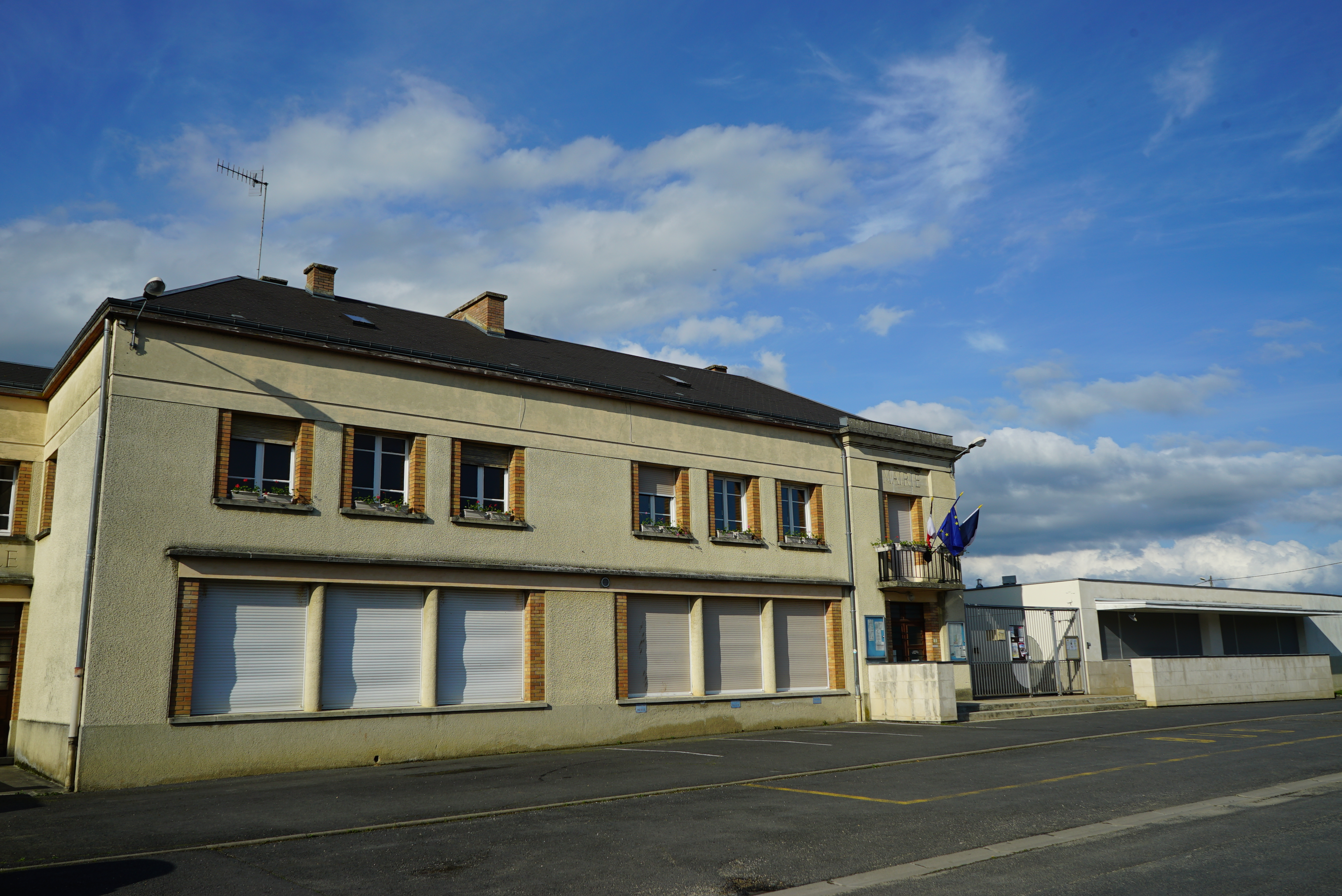
- The town hall in Courlandon
- Location of Courlandon
- Location within France Location within Grand Est
- Coordinates: 49°18′52″N 3°44′09″E
- Country: France
- Region: Grand Est
- Department: Marne
- Arrondissement: Reims
- Canton: Fismes-Montagne de Reims
- Intercommunality: CU Grand Reims

Government
  - Mayor (2020–2026): Patrice Morel
- Area^{1}: 3.4 km^{2} (1.3 sq mi)
- Highest elevation: 175 m (574 ft)
- Lowest elevation: 62 m (203 ft)
- Population (2023): 302
  - Density: 89/km^{2} (230/sq mi)
- Time zone: UTC+01:00 (CET)
  - Summer (DST): UTC+02:00 (CEST)
- INSEE/Postal code: 51187 /51170
- ^{1} French Land Register data, which excludes lakes, ponds, glaciers > 1 km^{2} (0.386 sq mi or 247 acres) and river estuaries.

Courlandon (French pronunciation: [kuʁlɑ̃dɔ̃]) is a commune in the Marne department in north-eastern France.

== See also ==
- Communes of the Marne department
