= Delphine Bouilly =

Canadian researcher in bionanoelectronics

Delphine Bouilly is a Canadian researcher in bionanoelectronics, the study of nanoscale electronic biosensors. She is an associate professor in the Department of Physics at the Université de Montréal, where she holds a tier 2 Canada Research Chair in Bionanoelectronics and is a principal investigator in the university's Institute for Research in Immunology and Cancer. She also co-directs the Thin Layers Group, a joint project of the Université de Montréal and Polytechnique Montréal.

== Education and career ==
Bouilly has a Ph.D. in physics from the Université de Montréal, completed in 2013. After postdoctoral research with Colin Nuckolls at Columbia University in the US, she returned to the Université de Montréal in 2017. On her return, she was given her Canada Research Chair; it was renewed in 2023. She became co-director of the Thin Layers Group in 2023.

== Recognition ==
Bouilly was the 2009 recipient of the André Hamer Postgraduate Prize of NSERC, and the 2024 recipient of the biennial Nanocarbons SES Research Young Investigator Award of The Electrochemical Society. She was elected to the Royal Society of Canada College of New Scholars, Artists and Scientists in 2025.
