= Germigny, Marne =

Germigny
- Commune
- Location of Germigny
- Location within France Location within Grand Est
- Coordinates: 49°14′42″N 3°52′01″E
- Country: France
- Region: Grand Est
- Department: Marne
- Arrondissement: Reims
- Canton: Fismes-Montagne de Reims
- Intercommunality: CU Grand Reims

Government
  - Mayor (2020–2026): Bruno Arizzi
- Area^{1}: 2.39 km^{2} (0.92 sq mi)
- Elevation: 160 m (520 ft)
- Population (2023): 188
  - Density: 78.7/km^{2} (204/sq mi)
- Time zone: UTC+01:00 (CET)
  - Summer (DST): UTC+02:00 (CEST)
- INSEE/Postal code: 51267 /51390
- ^{1} French Land Register data, which excludes lakes, ponds, glaciers > 1 km^{2} (0.386 sq mi or 247 acres) and river estuaries.

Germigny (French pronunciation: [ʒɛʁmiɲi]) is a commune in the Marne department in north-eastern France.

== See also ==
- Communes of the Marne department
