= Janvry, Marne =

Janvry
- Commune
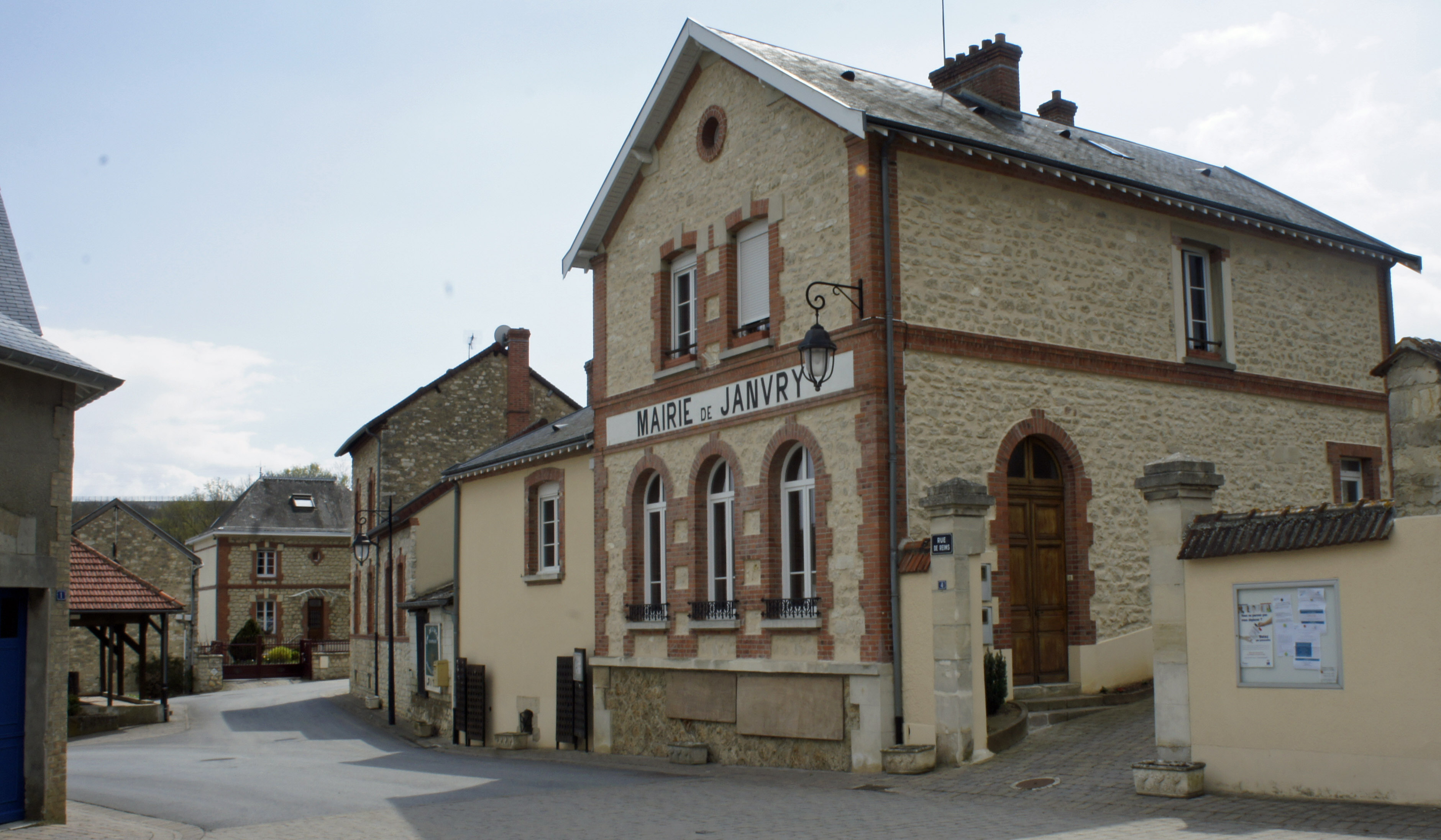
- The town hall in Janvry

- Coat of arms
- Location of Janvry
- Location within France Location within Grand Est
- Coordinates: 49°14′45″N 3°52′37″E
- Country: France
- Region: Grand Est
- Department: Marne
- Arrondissement: Reims
- Canton: Fismes-Montagne de Reims
- Intercommunality: CU Grand Reims

Government
  - Mayor (2020–2026): Cécile Conreau
- Area^{1}: 1.94 km^{2} (0.75 sq mi)
- Elevation: 135 m (443 ft)
- Population (2023): 155
  - Density: 79.9/km^{2} (207/sq mi)
- Time zone: UTC+01:00 (CET)
  - Summer (DST): UTC+02:00 (CEST)
- INSEE/Postal code: 51305 /51390
- Website: Official website
- ^{1} French Land Register data, which excludes lakes, ponds, glaciers > 1 km^{2} (0.386 sq mi or 247 acres) and river estuaries.

Janvry (French pronunciation: [ʒɑ̃vʁi]) is a commune in the Marne department in north-eastern France. The village is located at about 15 km (9.3 mi) west of Reims.

== See also ==
- Communes of the Marne department
