= Bouilly, Marne =

Bouilly
- Commune
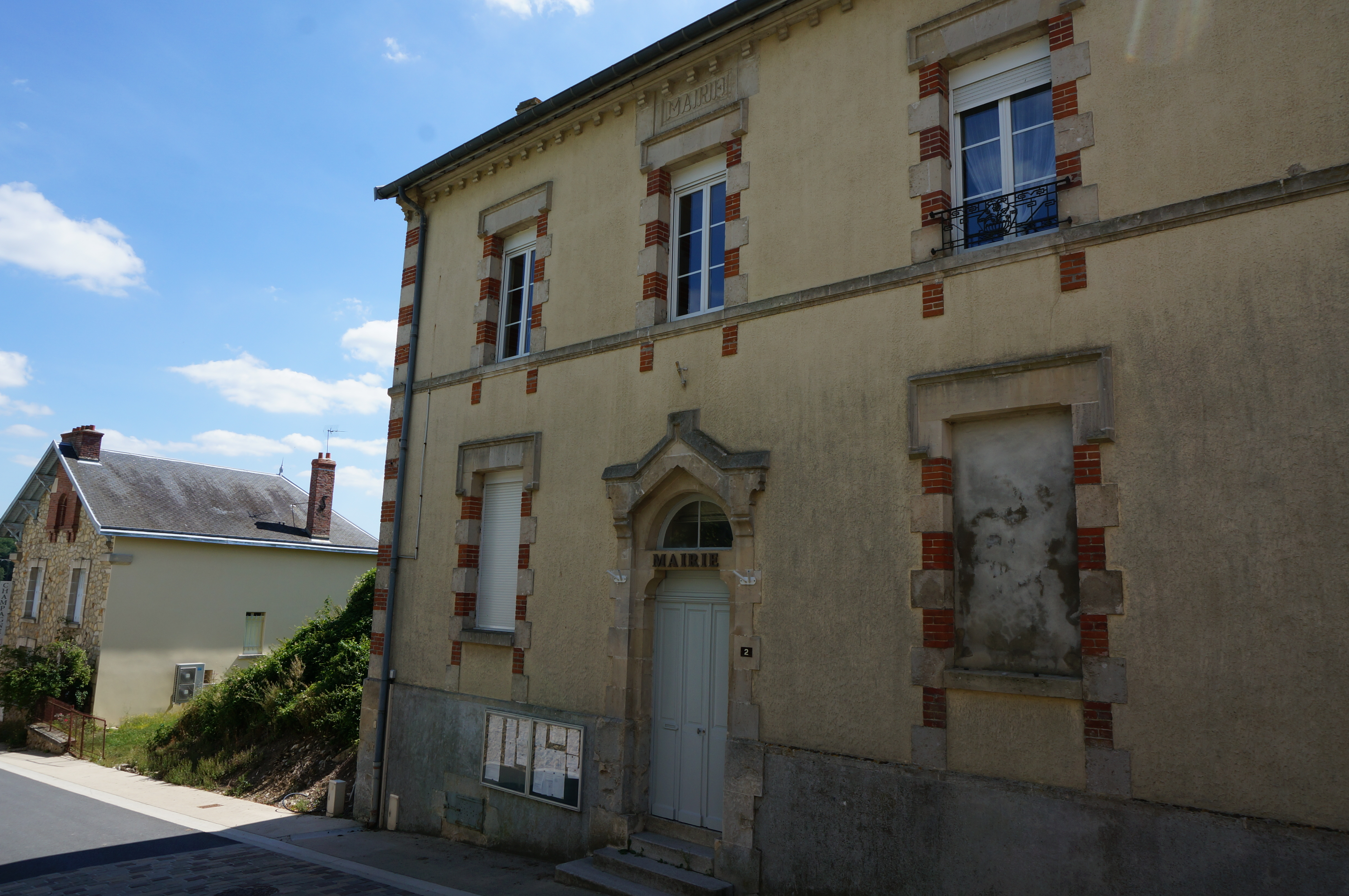
- The town hall in Bouilly

- Coat of arms
- Location of Bouilly
- Location within France Location within Grand Est
- Coordinates: 49°11′56″N 3°53′24″E
- Country: France
- Region: Grand Est
- Department: Marne
- Arrondissement: Reims
- Canton: Fismes-Montagne de Reims
- Intercommunality: CU Grand Reims

Government
  - Mayor (2020–2026): Claude Mauprivez
- Area^{1}: 5.64 km^{2} (2.18 sq mi)
- Highest elevation: 239 m (784 ft)
- Lowest elevation: 130 m (430 ft)
- Population (2023): 230
  - Density: 41/km^{2} (110/sq mi)
- Time zone: UTC+01:00 (CET)
  - Summer (DST): UTC+02:00 (CEST)
- INSEE/Postal code: 51072 /51390
- ^{1} French Land Register data, which excludes lakes, ponds, glaciers > 1 km^{2} (0.386 sq mi or 247 acres) and river estuaries.

Bouilly (French pronunciation: [buji]) is a commune of the Marne department in northeastern France.

== Population ==
Historical population
Year	Pop.	±% p.a.
1968	80	—
1975	128	+6.94%
1982	158	+3.05%
1990	166	+0.62%
1999	152	−0.97%
2007	163	+0.88%
2012	178	+1.78%
2017	203	+2.66%
2023	230	+2.10%
Source: INSEE

== See also ==
- Communes of the Marne department
- Montagne de Reims Regional Natural Park
