= Baslieux-sous-Châtillon =

- Commune
- Location of Baslieux-sous-Châtillon
- Location within France Location within Grand Est
- Coordinates: 49°07′25″N 3°48′00″E
- Country: France
- Region: Grand Est
- Department: Marne
- Arrondissement: Épernay
- Canton: Dormans-Paysages de Champagne

Government
  - Mayor (2020–2026): Xavier Carton
- Area^{1}: 5.88 km^{2} (2.27 sq mi)
- Elevation: 110 m (360 ft)
- Population (2023): 175
  - Density: 29.8/km^{2} (77.1/sq mi)
- Time zone: UTC+01:00 (CET)
  - Summer (DST): UTC+02:00 (CEST)
- INSEE/Postal code: 51038 /51700
- ^{1} French Land Register data, which excludes lakes, ponds, glaciers > 1 km^{2} (0.386 sq mi or 247 acres) and river estuaries.

Baslieux-sous-Châtillon (French pronunciation: [baljø su ʃatijɔ̃], literally Baslieux under Châtillon) is a commune in the Marne department in northeastern France.

== Population ==
Historical population
Year	Pop.	±% p.a.
1968	164	—
1975	158	−0.53%
1982	151	−0.65%
1990	159	+0.65%
1999	173	+0.94%
2007	199	+1.77%
2012	178	−2.21%
2017	191	+1.42%
2023	175	−1.45%
Source: INSEE

== See also ==
- Communes of the Marne department
- Montagne de Reims Regional Natural Park
