= Cuisles =

- Commune
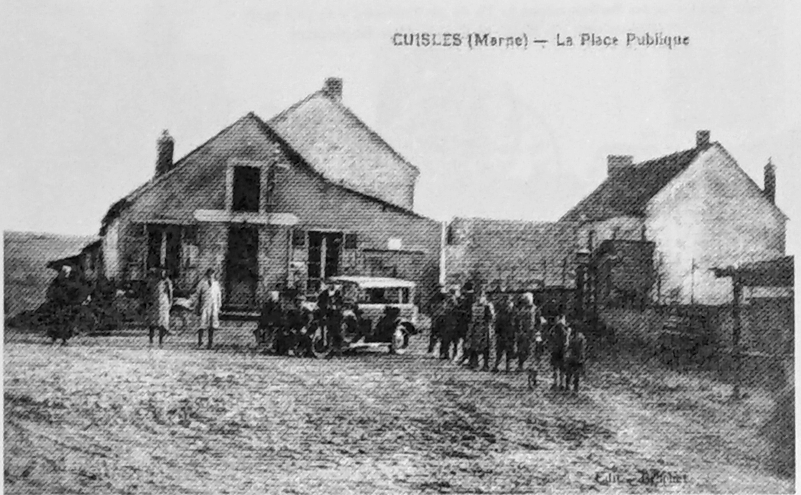
- Cuisles in the early 20th century

- Coat of arms
- Location of Cuisles
- Location within France Location within Grand Est
- Coordinates: 49°07′52″N 3°46′25″E
- Country: France
- Region: Grand Est
- Department: Marne
- Arrondissement: Reims
- Canton: Dormans-Paysages de Champagne
- Intercommunality: CU Grand Reims

Government
  - Mayor (2020–2026): Laurence Deplaine
- Area^{1}: 2.78 km^{2} (1.07 sq mi)
- Elevation: 148 m (486 ft)
- Population (2023): 133
  - Density: 47.8/km^{2} (124/sq mi)
- Time zone: UTC+01:00 (CET)
  - Summer (DST): UTC+02:00 (CEST)
- INSEE/Postal code: 51201 /51700
- ^{1} French Land Register data, which excludes lakes, ponds, glaciers > 1 km^{2} (0.386 sq mi or 247 acres) and river estuaries.

Cuisles (French pronunciation: [kɥil]) is a commune in the Marne department in north-eastern France.

On 1 July 1973, the commune was merged with that of Châtillon-sur-Marne, but on 1 March 2006, it was re-established as a separate commune in its own right.

== See also ==
- Communes of the Marne department
- Montagne de Reims Regional Natural Park
