= Villers-sous-Châtillon =

- Part of Cœur-de-la-Vallée
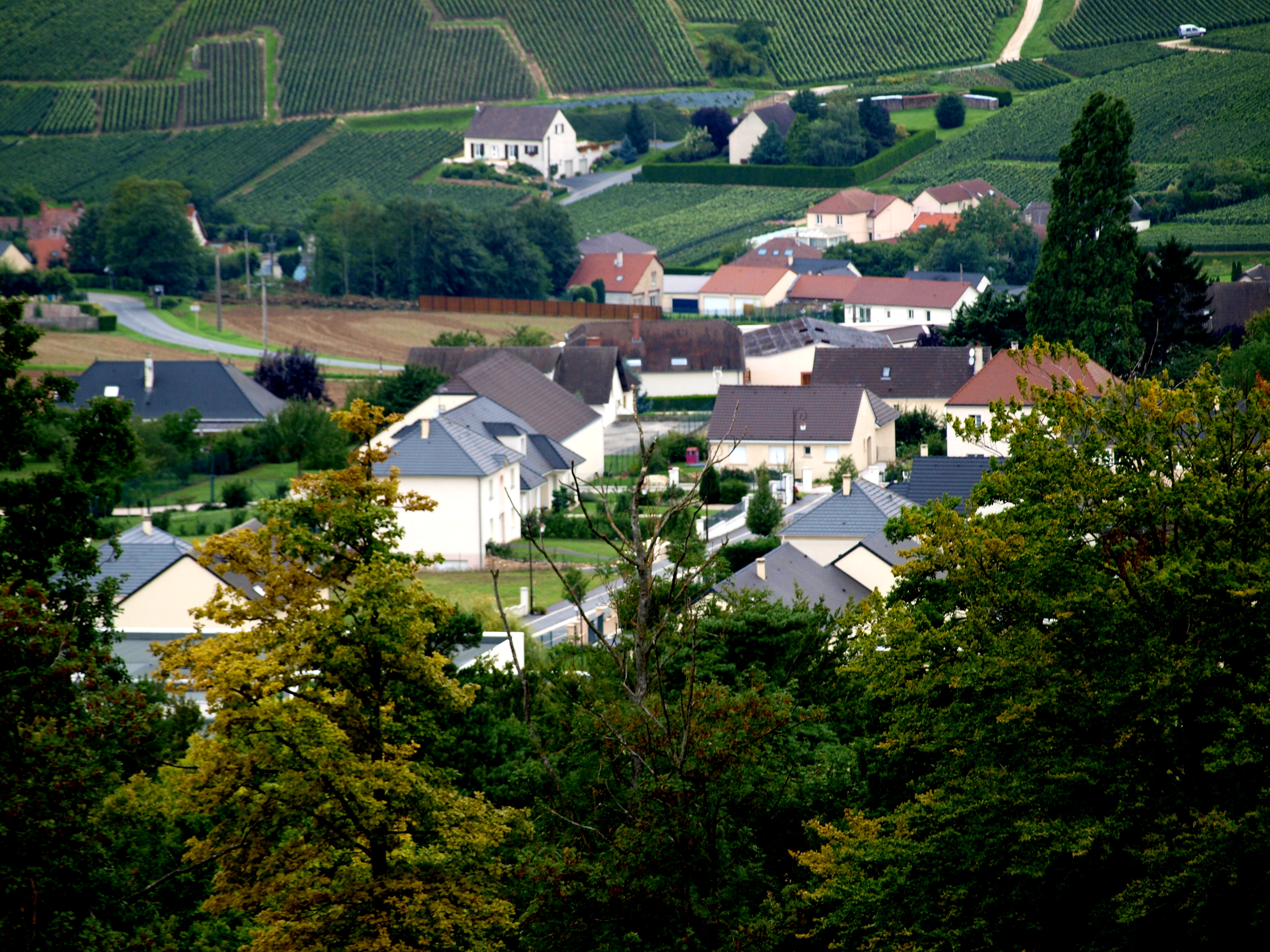
- An aerial view of Villers-sous-Châtillon
- Location of Villers-sous-Châtillon
- Location within France Location within Grand Est
- Coordinates: 49°05′45″N 3°47′57″E
- Country: France
- Region: Grand Est
- Department: Marne
- Arrondissement: Épernay
- Canton: Dormans-Paysages de Champagne
- Commune: Cœur-de-la-Vallée
- Area^{1}: 4.84 km^{2} (1.87 sq mi)
- Highest elevation: 255 m (837 ft)
- Lowest elevation: 95 m (312 ft)
- Population (2022): 209
  - Density: 43.2/km^{2} (112/sq mi)
- Time zone: UTC+01:00 (CET)
  - Summer (DST): UTC+02:00 (CEST)
- Postal code: 51700
- ^{1} French Land Register data, which excludes lakes, ponds, glaciers > 1 km^{2} (0.386 sq mi or 247 acres) and river estuaries.

Villers-sous-Châtillon (French pronunciation: [vilɛʁ su ʃatijɔ̃], literally Villers under Châtillon) is a former commune in the Marne department in north-eastern France. On 1 January 2023, it was merged into the new commune of Cœur-de-la-Vallée.

== See also ==
- Communes of the Marne department
- Montagne de Reims Regional Natural Park
