= Belval-sous-Châtillon =

- Commune
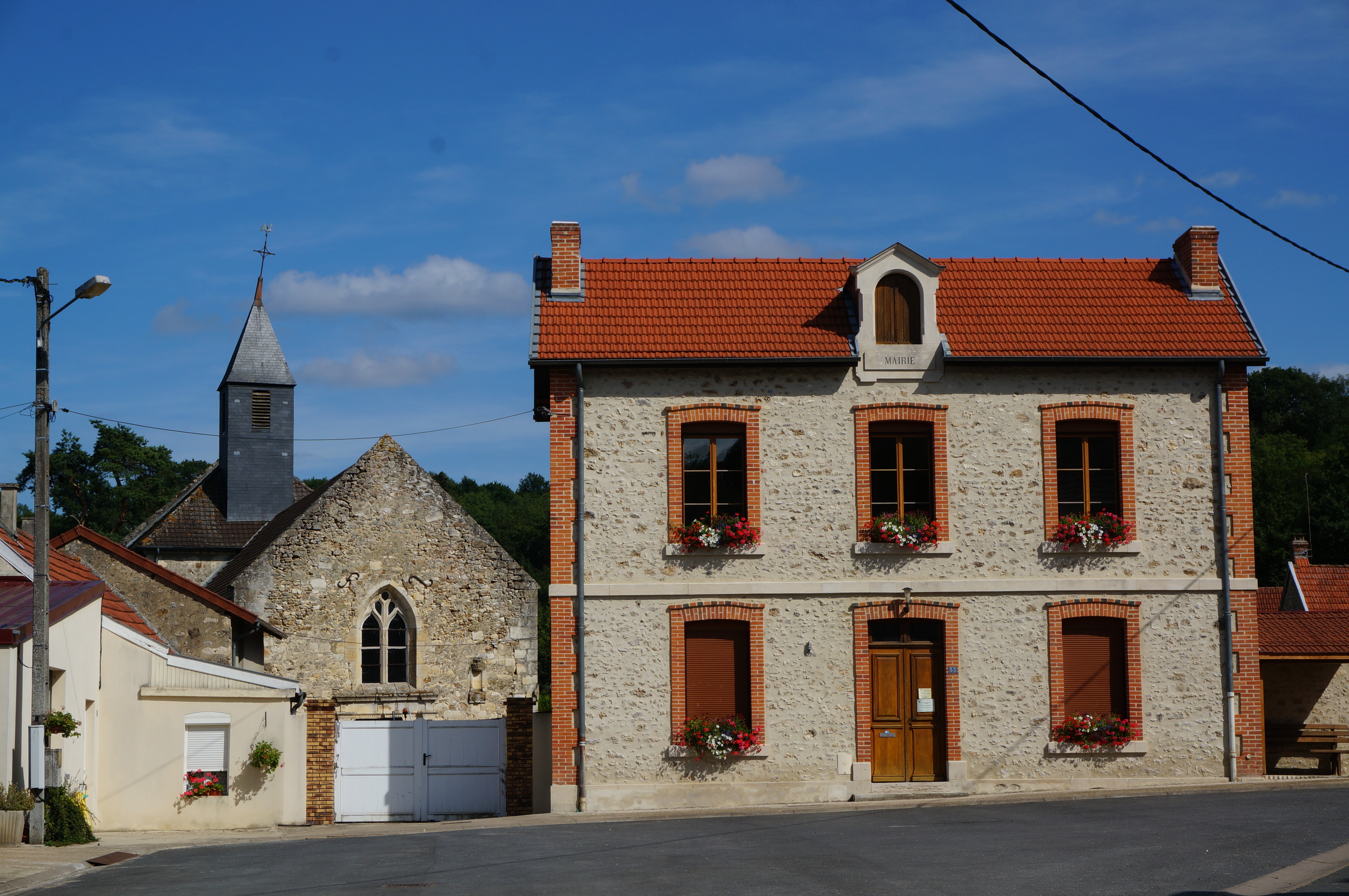
- The town hall in Belval-sous-Châtillon
- Location of Belval-sous-Châtillon
- Location within France Location within Grand Est
- Coordinates: 49°07′30″N 3°51′11″E
- Country: France
- Region: Grand Est
- Department: Marne
- Arrondissement: Épernay
- Canton: Dormans-Paysages de Champagne

Government
  - Mayor (2020–2026): Pascal Naillon
- Area^{1}: 7.15 km^{2} (2.76 sq mi)
- Elevation: 189 m (620 ft)
- Population (2023): 174
  - Density: 24.3/km^{2} (63.0/sq mi)
- Time zone: UTC+01:00 (CET)
  - Summer (DST): UTC+02:00 (CEST)
- INSEE/Postal code: 51048 /51480
- ^{1} French Land Register data, which excludes lakes, ponds, glaciers > 1 km^{2} (0.386 sq mi or 247 acres) and river estuaries.

Belval-sous-Châtillon (French pronunciation: [bɛlval su ʃatijɔ̃], literally Belval under Châtillon) is a commune in the Marne department in northeastern France.

== Population ==
Historical population
| Year | Pop. | ±% p.a. |
|---|---|---|
| 1968 | 136 | — |
| 1975 | 122 | −1.54% |
| 1982 | 134 | +1.35% |
| 1990 | 149 | +1.34% |
| 1999 | 157 | +0.58% |
| 2007 | 166 | +0.70% |
| 2012 | 185 | +2.19% |
| 2017 | 147 | −4.49% |
| 2023 | 174 | +2.85% |
Source: INSEE

== See also ==
- Communes of the Marne department
- Montagne de Reims Regional Natural Park
