= Chamery =

- Commune
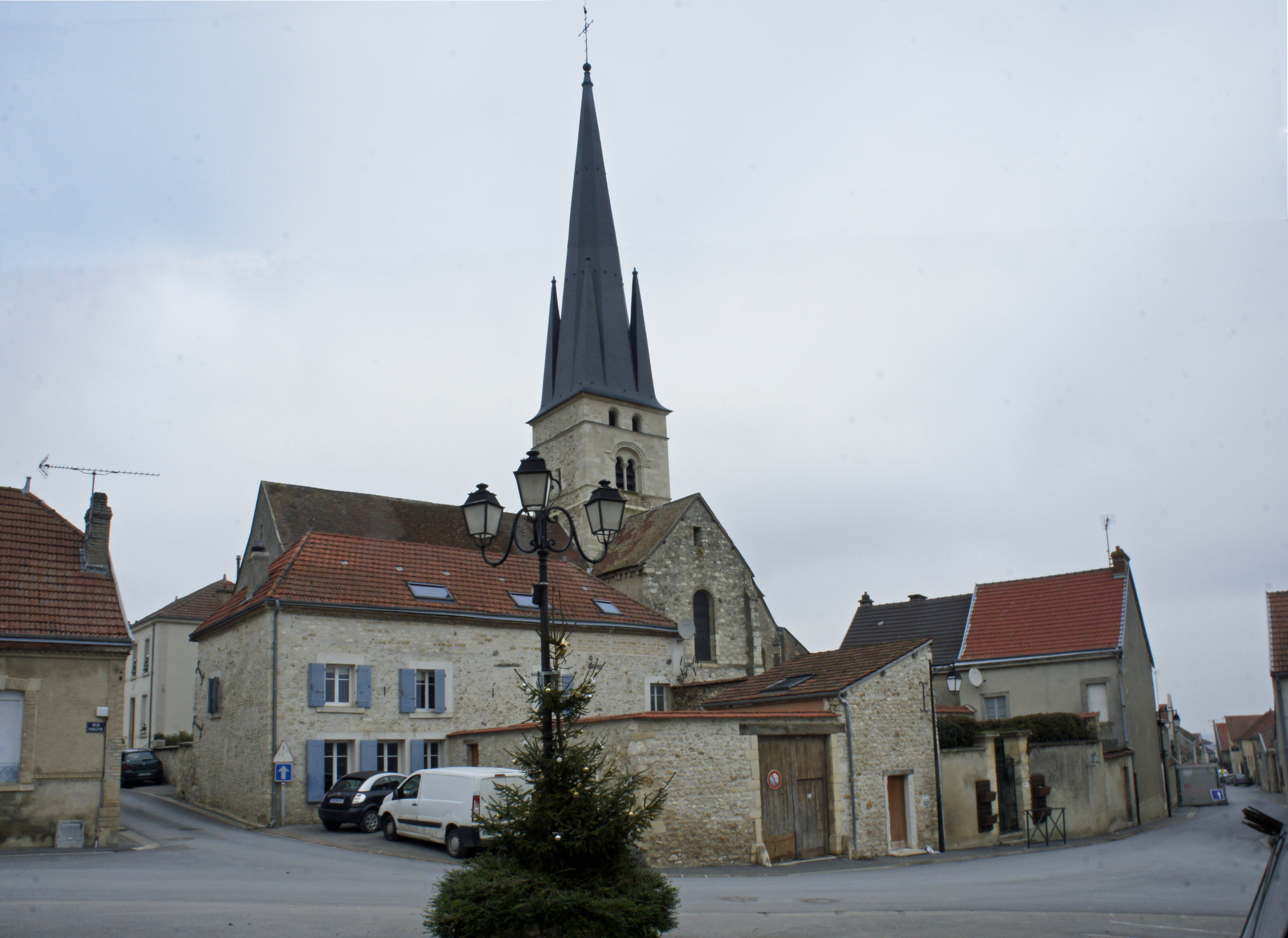
- The church in Chamery
- Location of Chamery
- Location within France Location within Grand Est
- Coordinates: 49°10′21″N 3°57′20″E
- Country: France
- Region: Grand Est
- Department: Marne
- Arrondissement: Reims
- Canton: Fismes-Montagne de Reims
- Intercommunality: CU Grand Reims

Government
  - Mayor (2020–2026): Jean-Marie Allouchery
- Area^{1}: 5.27 km^{2} (2.03 sq mi)
- Highest elevation: 268 m (879 ft)
- Lowest elevation: 114 m (374 ft)
- Population (2023): 464
  - Density: 88.0/km^{2} (228/sq mi)
- Time zone: UTC+01:00 (CET)
  - Summer (DST): UTC+02:00 (CEST)
- INSEE/Postal code: 51112 /51500
- ^{1} French Land Register data, which excludes lakes, ponds, glaciers > 1 km^{2} (0.386 sq mi or 247 acres) and river estuaries.

Chamery (French pronunciation: [ʃamʁi]) is a commune in the Marne department in north-eastern France.

== See also ==
- Communes of the Marne department
- Montagne de Reims Regional Natural Park
