= La Neuville-aux-Larris =

Neuville-aux-Larris
- Commune
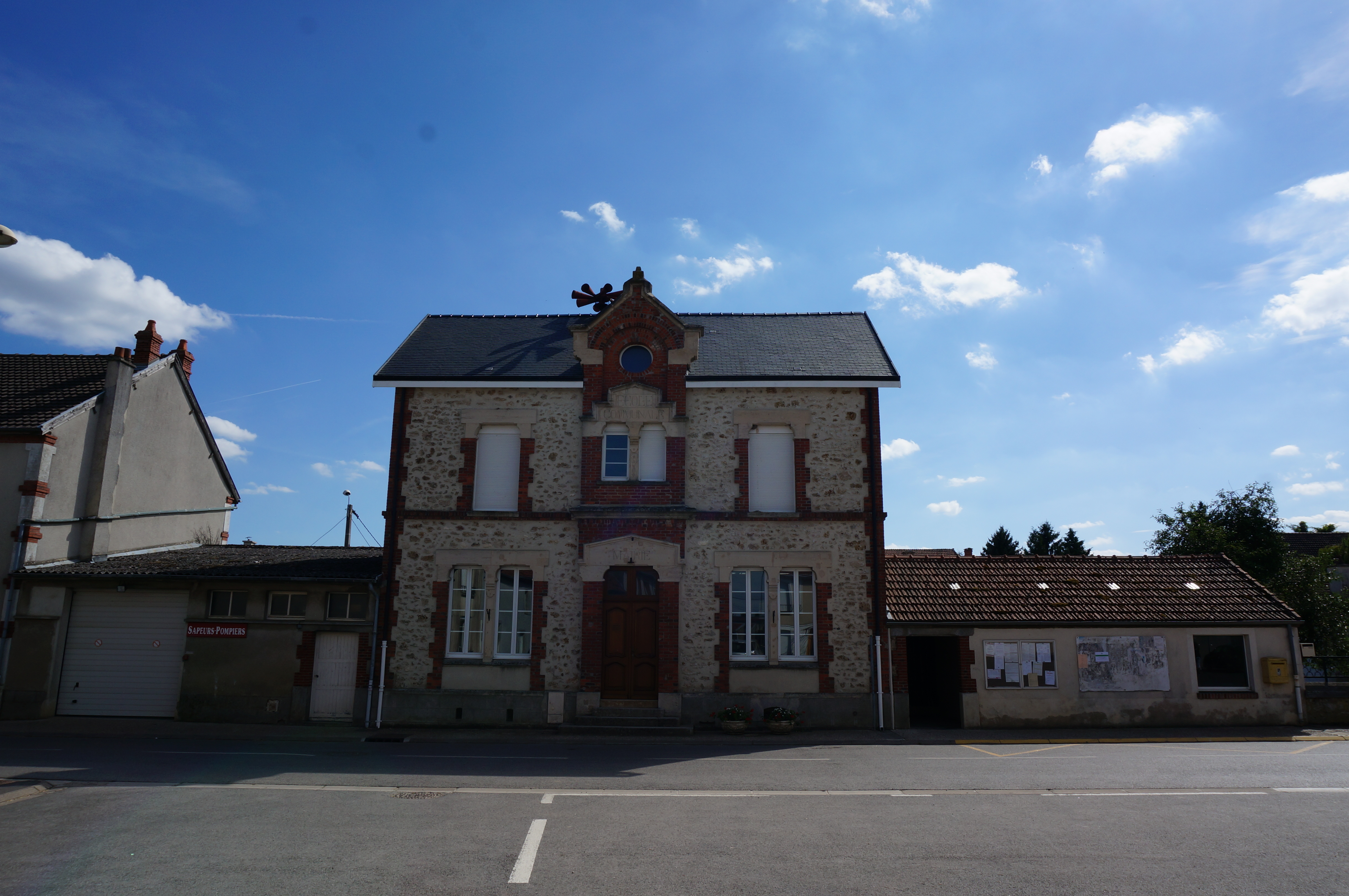
- The town hall in La Neuville-aux-Larris
- Location of Neuville-aux-Larris
- Location within France Location within Grand Est
- Coordinates: 49°08′37″N 3°50′35″E
- Country: France
- Region: Grand Est
- Department: Marne
- Arrondissement: Épernay
- Canton: Dormans-Paysages de Champagne
- Intercommunality: Paysages de la Champagne

Government
  - Mayor (2020–2026): Olivier Meunier
- Area^{1}: 1.64 km^{2} (0.63 sq mi)
- Highest elevation: 246 m (807 ft)
- Lowest elevation: 200 m (660 ft)
- Population (2023): 188
  - Density: 115/km^{2} (297/sq mi)
- Time zone: UTC+01:00 (CET)
  - Summer (DST): UTC+02:00 (CEST)
- INSEE/Postal code: 51398 /51480
- ^{1} French Land Register data, which excludes lakes, ponds, glaciers > 1 km^{2} (0.386 sq mi or 247 acres) and river estuaries.

La Neuville-aux-Larris (French pronunciation: [la nøvil o laʁi]) is a commune in the Marne department in the Grand Est region in north-eastern France.

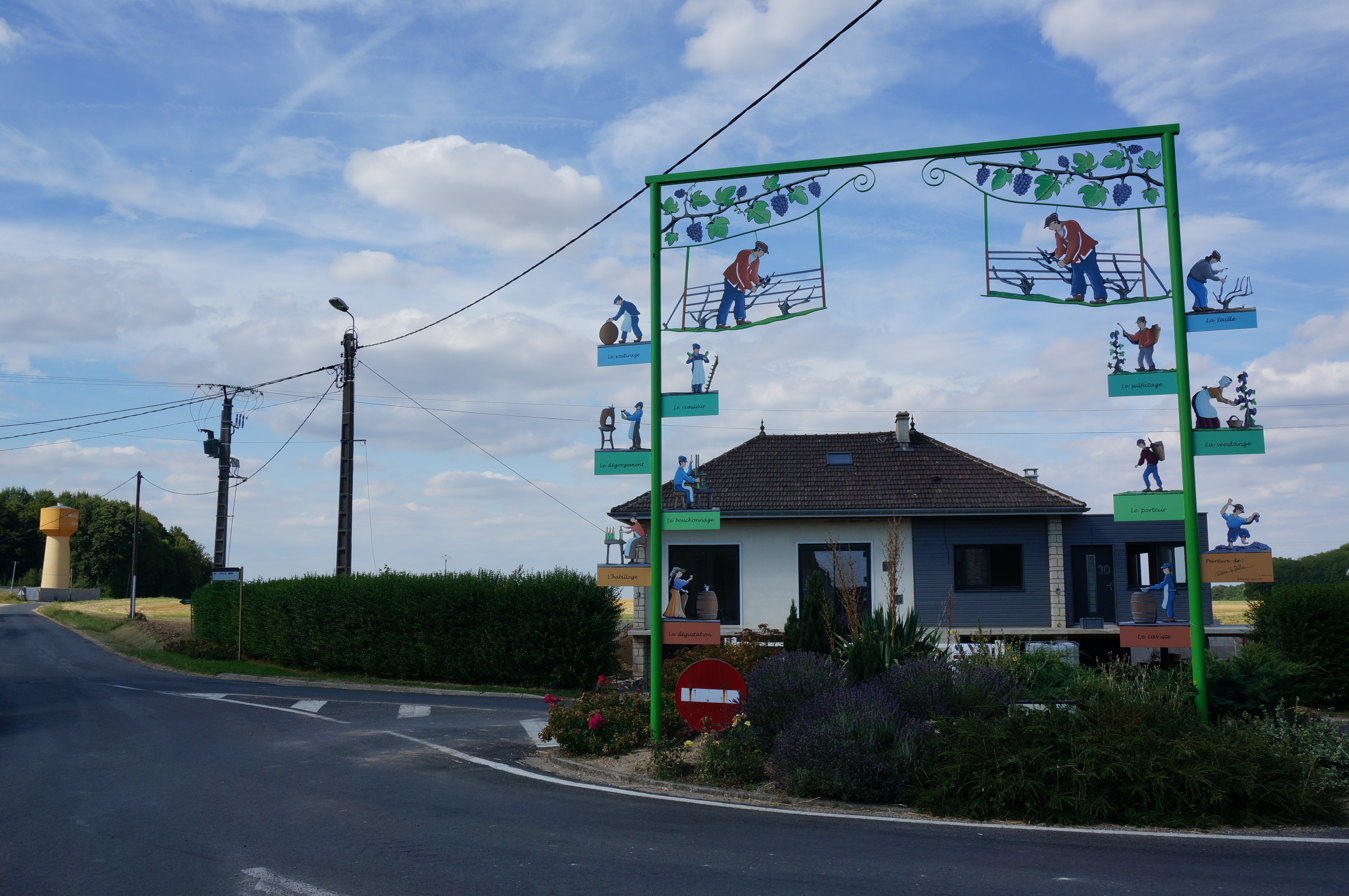

== See also ==
- Communes of the Marne department
- Montagne de Reims Regional Natural Park
