= Reuil =

- Part of Cœur-de-la-Vallée
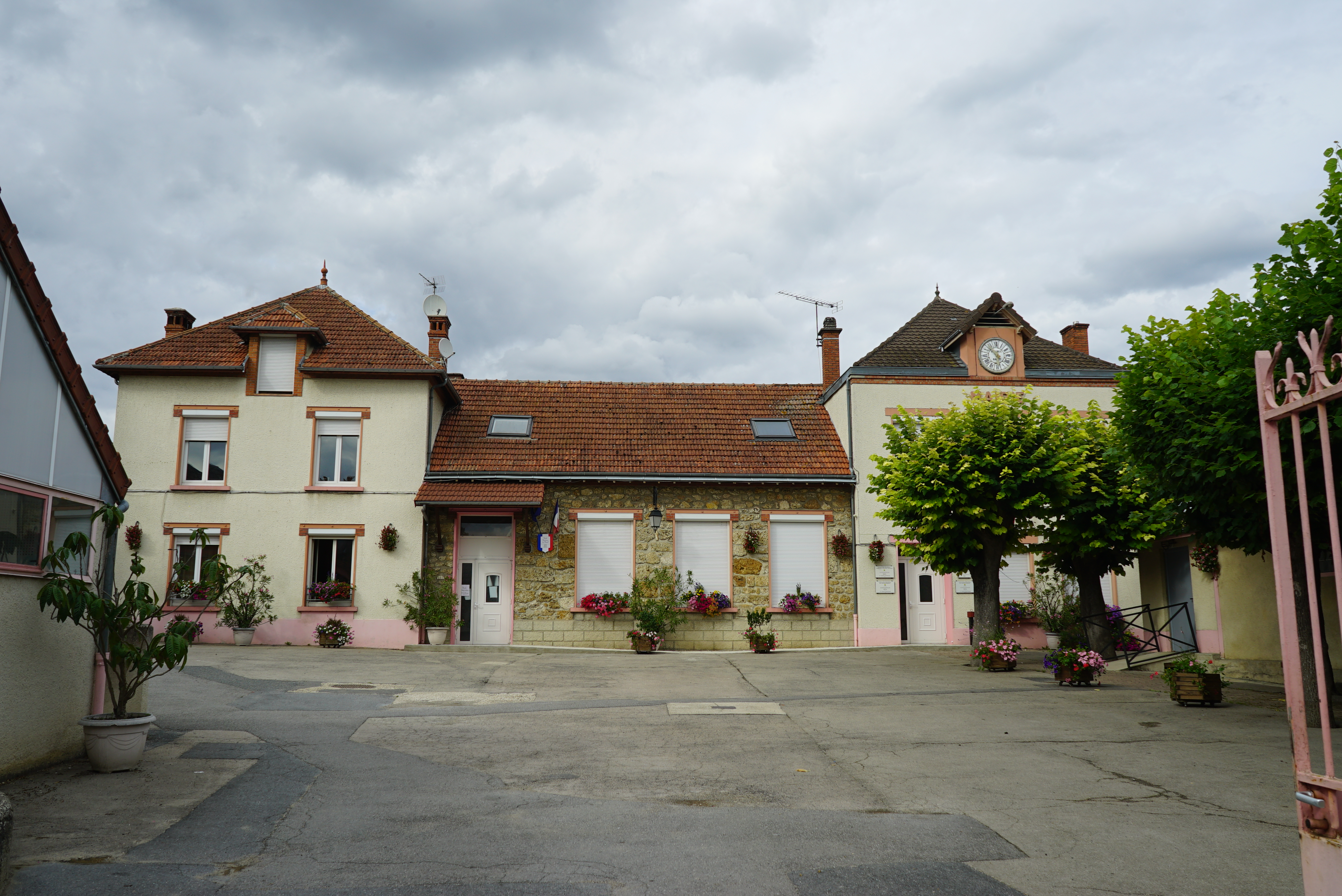
- The town hall in Reuil

- Coat of arms
- Location of Reuil
- Location within France Location within Grand Est
- Coordinates: 49°04′59″N 3°48′02″E
- Country: France
- Region: Grand Est
- Department: Marne
- Arrondissement: Épernay
- Canton: Dormans-Paysages de Champagne
- Commune: Cœur-de-la-Vallée
- Area^{1}: 5.36 km^{2} (2.07 sq mi)
- Elevation: 67 m (220 ft)
- Population (2022): 273
  - Density: 50.9/km^{2} (132/sq mi)
- Time zone: UTC+01:00 (CET)
  - Summer (DST): UTC+02:00 (CEST)
- Postal code: 51480
- ^{1} French Land Register data, which excludes lakes, ponds, glaciers > 1 km^{2} (0.386 sq mi or 247 acres) and river estuaries.

Reuil (French pronunciation: [ʁœj]) is a former commune in the Marne department in north-eastern France. On 1 January 2023, it was merged into the new commune of Cœur-de-la-Vallée.

== Population ==
Historical population
Year	Pop.	±% p.a.
1968	293	—
1975	278	−0.75%
1982	279	+0.05%
1990	299	+0.87%
1999	305	+0.22%
2007	304	−0.04%
2012	301	−0.20%
2017	277	−1.65%
Source: INSEE

== See also ==
- Communes of the Marne department
- Montagne de Reims Regional Natural Park
