= Méry-Prémecy =

- Commune
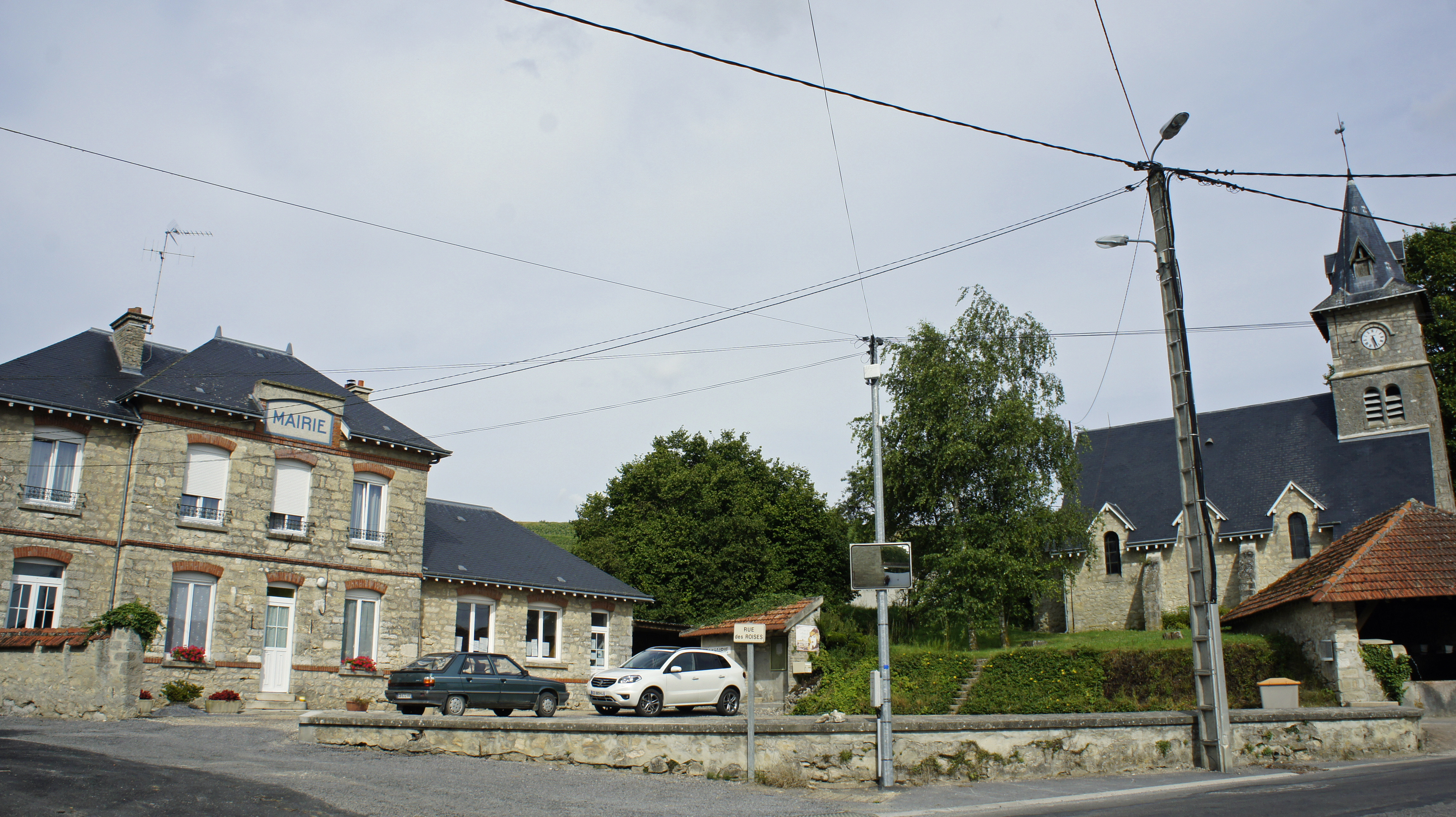
- The town hall and church in Méry-Prémecy
- Location of Méry-Prémecy
- Location within France Location within Grand Est
- Coordinates: 49°13′35″N 3°51′45″E
- Country: France
- Region: Grand Est
- Department: Marne
- Arrondissement: Reims
- Canton: Fismes-Montagne de Reims
- Intercommunality: CU Grand Reims

Government
  - Mayor (2020–2026): Franck Asselin
- Area^{1}: 5.11 km^{2} (1.97 sq mi)
- Elevation: 140 m (460 ft)
- Population (2023): 68
  - Density: 13/km^{2} (34/sq mi)
- Time zone: UTC+01:00 (CET)
  - Summer (DST): UTC+02:00 (CEST)
- INSEE/Postal code: 51364 /51390
- ^{1} French Land Register data, which excludes lakes, ponds, glaciers > 1 km^{2} (0.386 sq mi or 247 acres) and river estuaries.

Méry-Prémecy (French pronunciation: [meʁi pʁemsi]) is a commune in the Marne department in north-eastern France.

== See also ==
- Communes of the Marne department
- Montagne de Reims Regional Natural Park
