= Chambrecy =

- Commune
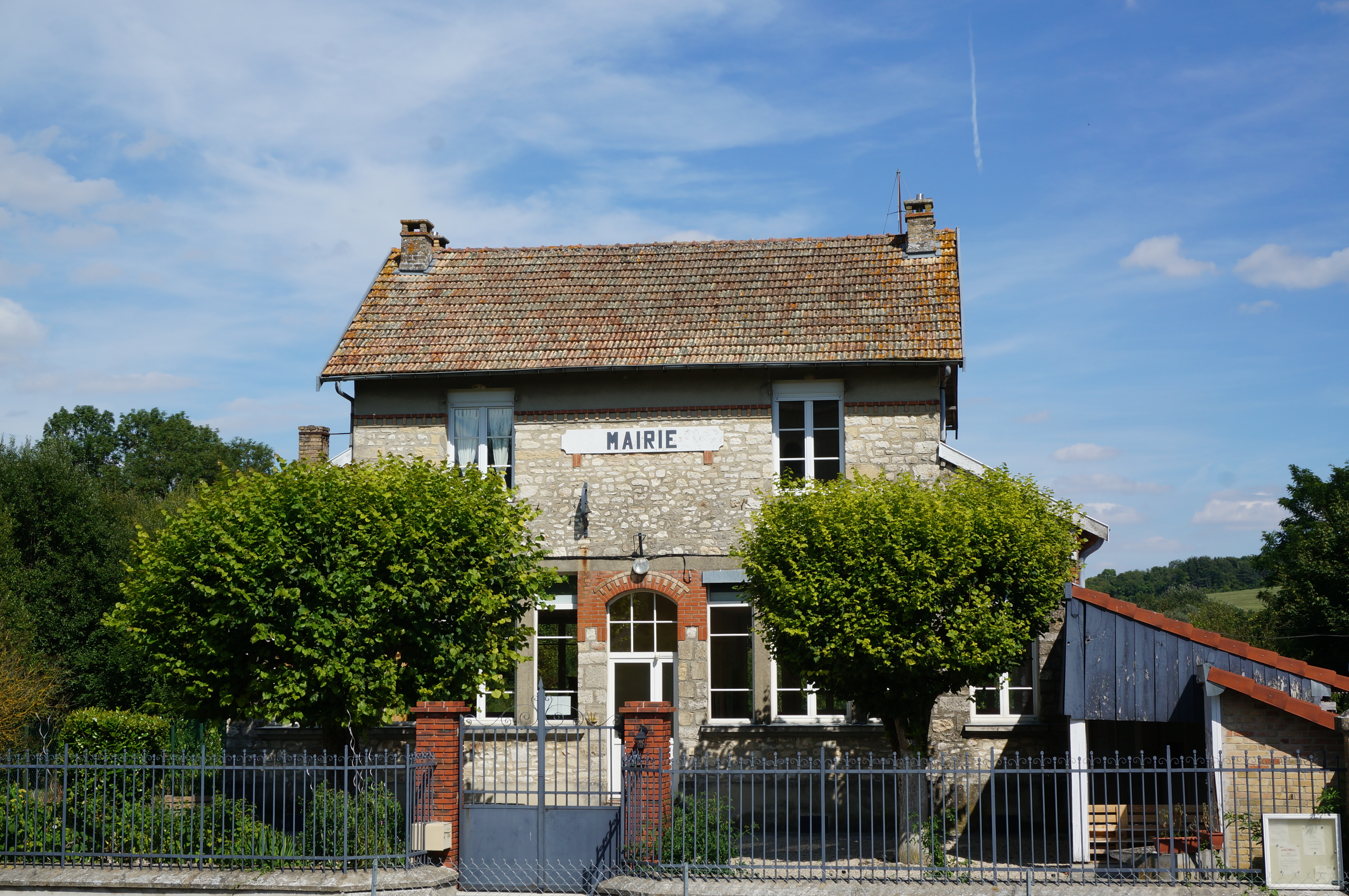
- The town hall in Chambrecy
- Location of Chambrecy
- Location within France Location within Grand Est
- Coordinates: 49°11′02″N 3°49′23″E
- Country: France
- Region: Grand Est
- Department: Marne
- Arrondissement: Reims
- Canton: Dormans-Paysages de Champagne
- Intercommunality: CU Grand Reims

Government
  - Mayor (2020–2026): Colette Macquart
- Area^{1}: 6.12 km^{2} (2.36 sq mi)
- Elevation: 183 m (600 ft)
- Population (2023): 146
  - Density: 23.9/km^{2} (61.8/sq mi)
- Time zone: UTC+01:00 (CET)
  - Summer (DST): UTC+02:00 (CEST)
- INSEE/Postal code: 51111 /51170
- ^{1} French Land Register data, which excludes lakes, ponds, glaciers > 1 km^{2} (0.386 sq mi or 247 acres) and river estuaries.

Chambrecy is a commune in the Marne department in north-eastern France.

== See also ==
- Communes of the Marne department
- Montagne de Reims Regional Natural Park
