= Vrigny, Marne =

Vrigny
- Commune
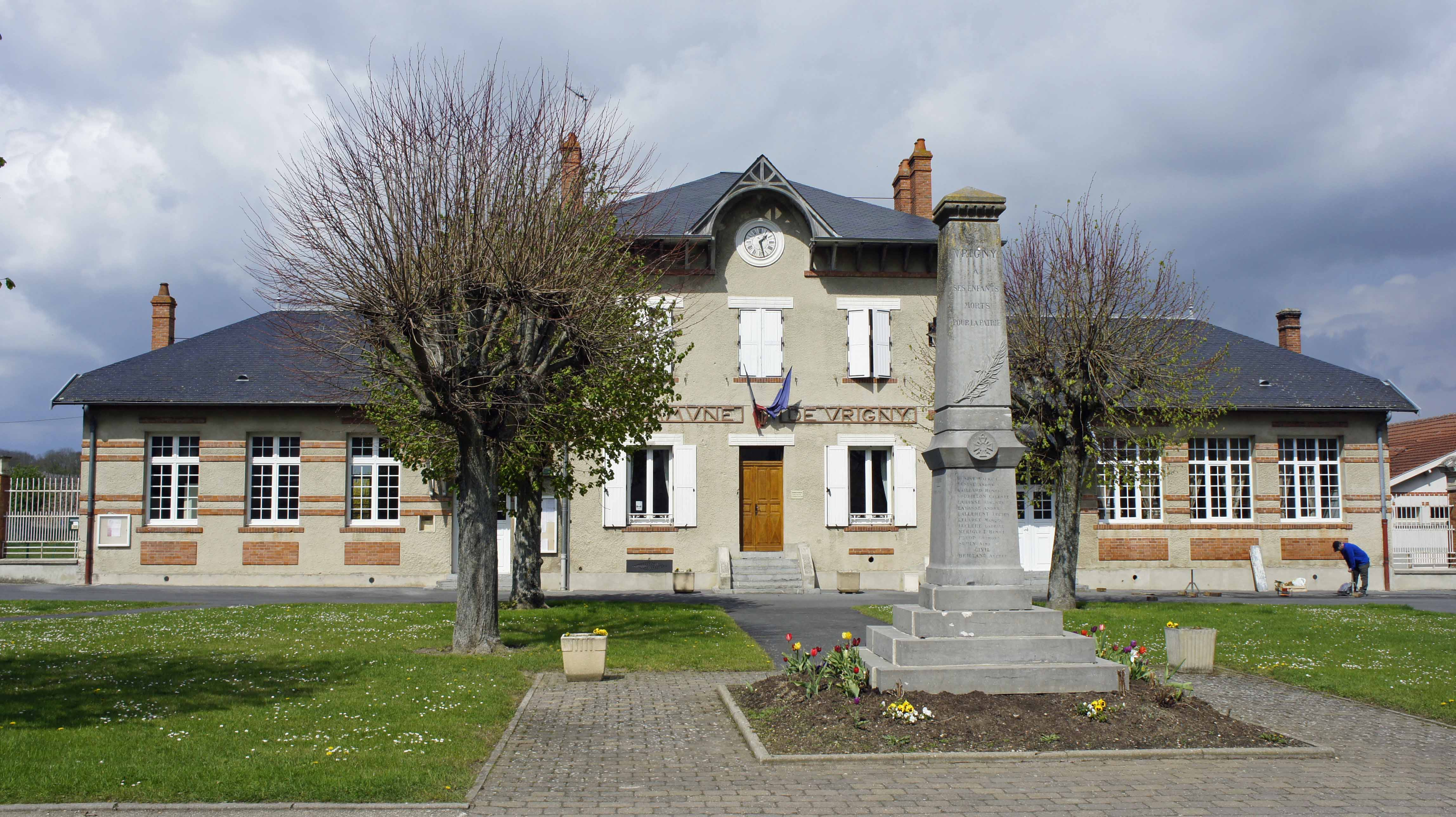
- The town hall in Vrigny
- Location of Vrigny
- Location within France Location within Grand Est
- Coordinates: 49°14′05″N 3°54′50″E
- Country: France
- Region: Grand Est
- Department: Marne
- Arrondissement: Reims
- Canton: Fismes-Montagne de Reims
- Intercommunality: Grand Reims

Government
  - Mayor (2020–2026): Jean-Marie Vieville
- Area^{1}: 4.46 km^{2} (1.72 sq mi)
- Elevation: 121 m (397 ft)
- Population (2023): 234
  - Density: 52.5/km^{2} (136/sq mi)
- Time zone: UTC+01:00 (CET)
  - Summer (DST): UTC+02:00 (CEST)
- INSEE/Postal code: 51657 /51390
- ^{1} French Land Register data, which excludes lakes, ponds, glaciers > 1 km^{2} (0.386 sq mi or 247 acres) and river estuaries.

Vrigny (French pronunciation: [vʁiɲi]) is a commune in the Marne department in north-eastern France.

== See also ==
- Communes of the Marne department
- Montagne de Reims Regional Natural Park
