= Binson-et-Orquigny =

- Part of Cœur-de-la-Vallée
- Location of Binson-et-Orquigny
- Location within France Location within Grand Est
- Coordinates: 49°05′39″N 3°47′15″E
- Country: France
- Region: Grand Est
- Department: Marne
- Arrondissement: Épernay
- Canton: Dormans-Paysages de Champagne
- Commune: Cœur-de-la-Vallée
- Area^{1}: 3.39 km^{2} (1.31 sq mi)
- Elevation: 83 m (272 ft)
- Population (2023): 163
  - Density: 48.1/km^{2} (125/sq mi)
- Time zone: UTC+01:00 (CET)
  - Summer (DST): UTC+02:00 (CEST)
- Postal code: 51700
- ^{1} French Land Register data, which excludes lakes, ponds, glaciers > 1 km^{2} (0.386 sq mi or 247 acres) and river estuaries.

Binson-et-Orquigny (French pronunciation: [bɛ̃sɔ̃ e ɔʁkiɲi]) is a former commune of the Marne department in northeastern France. On 1 January 2023, it was merged into the new commune of Cœur-de-la-Vallée.

== See also ==
- Communes of the Marne department
