= Fleury-la-Rivière =

- Commune
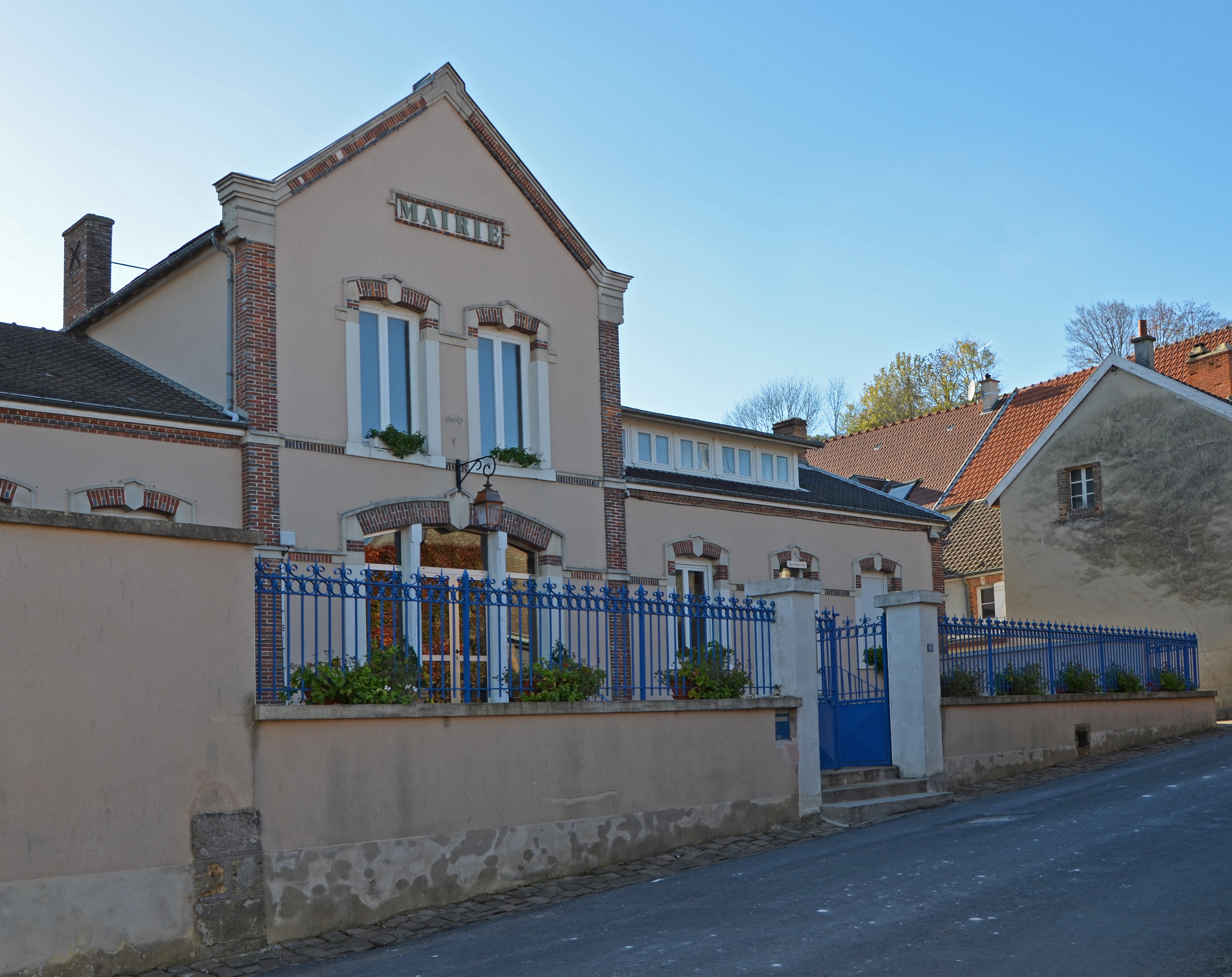
- The town hall in Fleury-la-Rivière
- Location of Fleury-la-Rivière
- Location within France Location within Grand Est
- Coordinates: 49°05′50″N 3°53′00″E
- Country: France
- Region: Grand Est
- Department: Marne
- Arrondissement: Épernay
- Canton: Dormans-Paysages de Champagne
- Intercommunality: Paysages de la Champagne

Government
  - Mayor (2020–2026): Freddy Lecacheur
- Area^{1}: 7.98 km^{2} (3.08 sq mi)
- Elevation: 182 m (597 ft)
- Population (2023): 523
  - Density: 65.5/km^{2} (170/sq mi)
- Time zone: UTC+01:00 (CET)
  - Summer (DST): UTC+02:00 (CEST)
- INSEE/Postal code: 51252 /51480
- ^{1} French Land Register data, which excludes lakes, ponds, glaciers > 1 km^{2} (0.386 sq mi or 247 acres) and river estuaries.

Fleury-la-Rivière (French pronunciation: [flœʁi la ʁivjɛʁ]) is a commune in the Marne department in north-eastern France.

== See also ==
- Communes of the Marne department
- Montagne de Reims Regional Natural Park
