= Verzenay =

- Commune
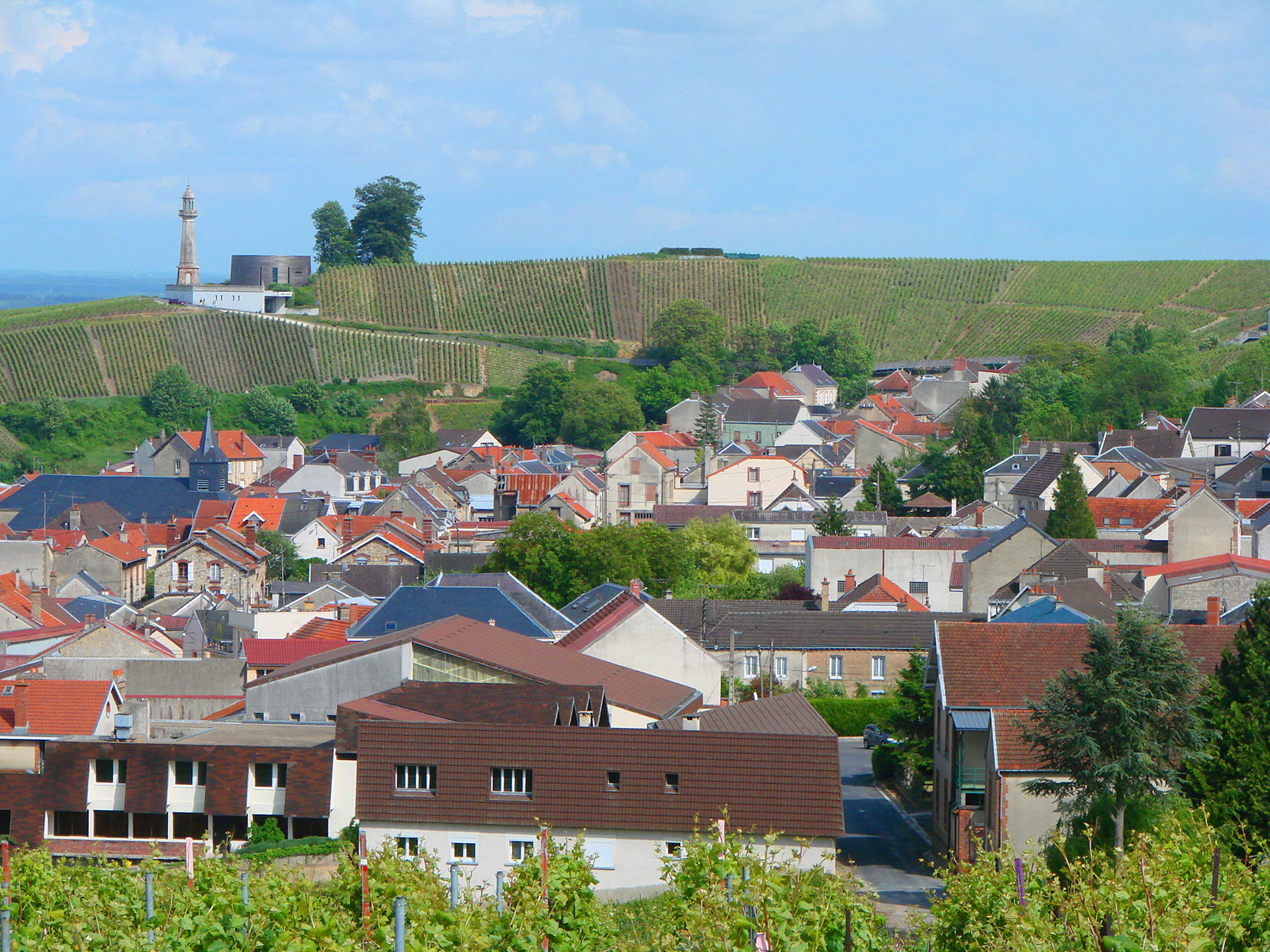
- View over Verzenay with the lighthouse in the background

- Coat of arms
- Location of Verzenay
- Location within France Location within Grand Est
- Coordinates: 49°09′33″N 4°08′46″E
- Country: France
- Region: Grand Est
- Department: Marne
- Arrondissement: Reims
- Canton: Mourmelon-Vesle et Monts de Champagne
- Intercommunality: CU Grand Reims

Government
  - Mayor (2020–2026): Cyrille Duterne
- Area^{1}: 10.62 km^{2} (4.10 sq mi)
- Highest elevation: 283 m (928 ft)
- Lowest elevation: 86 m (282 ft)
- Population (2023): 991
  - Density: 93.3/km^{2} (242/sq mi)
- Time zone: UTC+01:00 (CET)
  - Summer (DST): UTC+02:00 (CEST)
- INSEE/Postal code: 51613 /51360
- ^{1} French Land Register data, which excludes lakes, ponds, glaciers > 1 km^{2} (0.386 sq mi or 247 acres) and river estuaries.

Verzenay (French pronunciation: [vɛʁzənɛ]) is a commune in the Marne department in north-eastern France. The town is famed for its vineyards and its champagne.

== Champagne ==
The village's vineyards are located in the Montagne de Reims subregion of Champagne, and are classified as Grand Cru (100%) in the Champagne vineyard classification.

Verzenay is the location of Phare de Verzenay, a "Lighthouse" (Phare) which houses a Champagne museum.

== See also ==
- Communes of the Marne department
- Classification of Champagne vineyards
- Montagne de Reims Regional Natural Park
