= Montagne de Reims Regional Natural Park =

Regional park of France in Grand Est, France

Coordinates: 49°09′27″N 3°54′40″E

- IUCN category V (protected landscape/seascape)
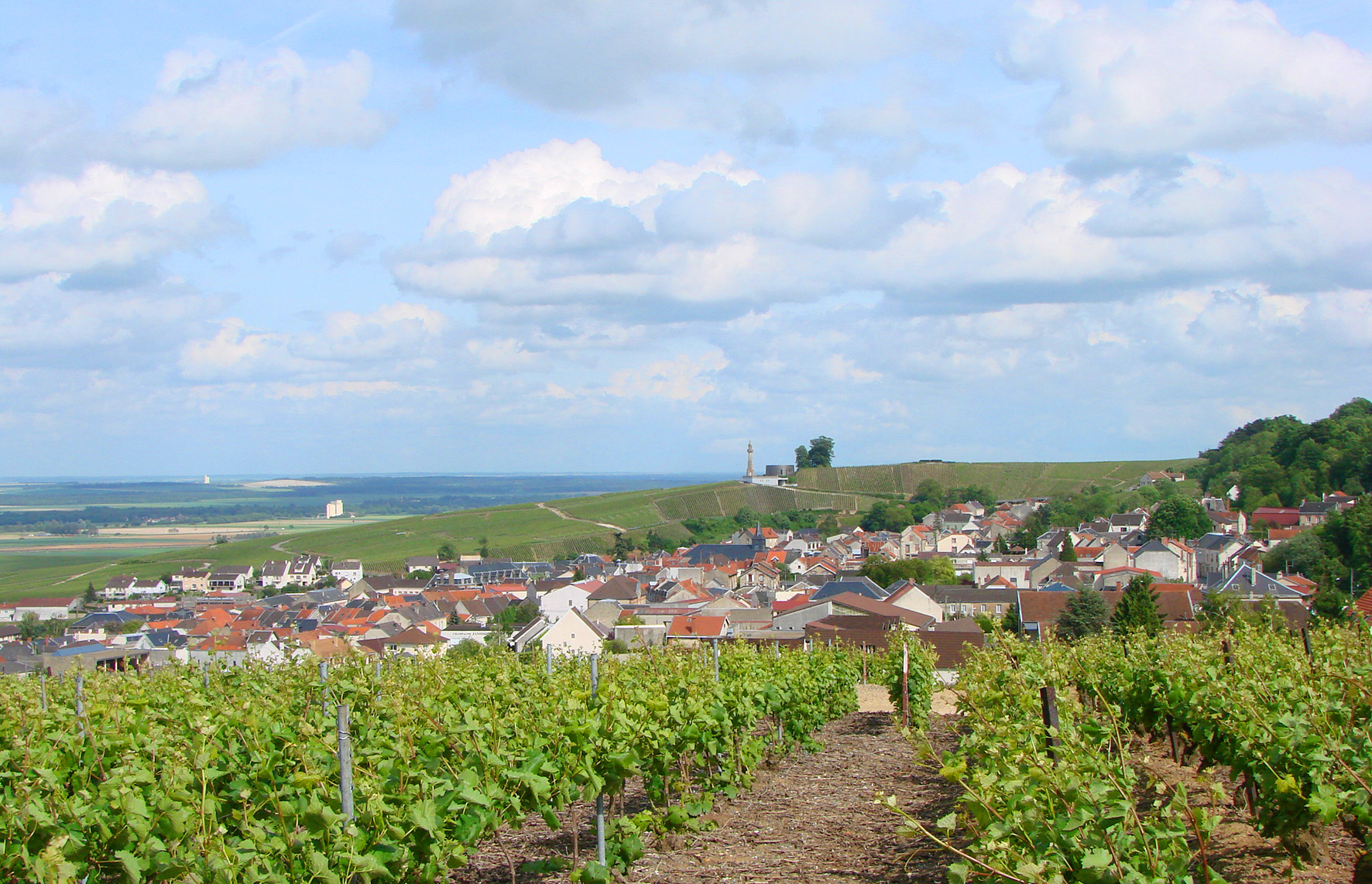
- The village of Verzenay with grape vineyards in the foreground
- Interactive map of Montagne de Reims Regional Natural Park
- Location: Grand Est, Marne, France
- Established: 1976
- Governing body: Fédération des parcs naturels régionaux de France
- Website: www.parc-montagnedereims.fr

Montagne de Reims Regional Natural Park (French: Parc naturel régional de la Montagne de Reims) is a protected area in the Grand Est region of France. It is organized around the Montagne de Reims, a wooded range of hills covered by vineyards that produce the region's eponymous sparkling wine, Champagne.

The area was officially designated as a regional natural park in 1976 with a total land area of 50,000 hectares (120,000 acres).

== Member communes ==
As of 2012, the following communes are park members:

- Ambonnay
- Aubilly
- Avenay-Val-d'Or
- Baslieux-sous-Chatillon
- Belval-sous-Chatillon
- Bisseuil
- Bligny
- Bouilly
- Bouleuse
- Bouzy
- Chambrecy
- Chamery
- Champillon
- Châtillon-sur-Marne
- Chaumuzy
- Chigny-les-Roses
- Cormoyeux
- Coulommes-la-Montagne
- Courmas
- Courtagnon
- Cuchery
- Cuisles
- Cumieres
- Damery
- Dizy
- Ecueil
- Fleury-la-Riviere
- Fontaine-sur-Ay
- Germaine
- Hautvillers
- Jonquery
- Jouy-les-Reims
- La Neuville-aux-Larris
- Louvois
- Ludes
- Mailly-Champagne
- Mareuil-sur-Ay
- Marfaux
- Méry-Prémecy
- Mutigny
- Nanteuil-la-Foret
- Pargny-les-Reims
- Poilly
- Pourcy
- Reuil
- Rilly-la-Montagne
- Romery
- Sacy
- Saint-Euphraise-et-Clairizet
- Saint-Imoges
- Sarcy
- Sermiers
- Tauxieres-Mutry
- Tours-sur-Marne
- Trépail
- Vandières
- Venteuil
- Verzenay
- Verzy
- Ville-en-Selve
- Ville-en-Tardenois
- Villers-Allerand
- Villers-Marmery
- Villers-sous-Châtillon
- Vrigny

== See also ==
- List of regional natural parks of France
