= Bligny, Marne =

Bligny
- Commune
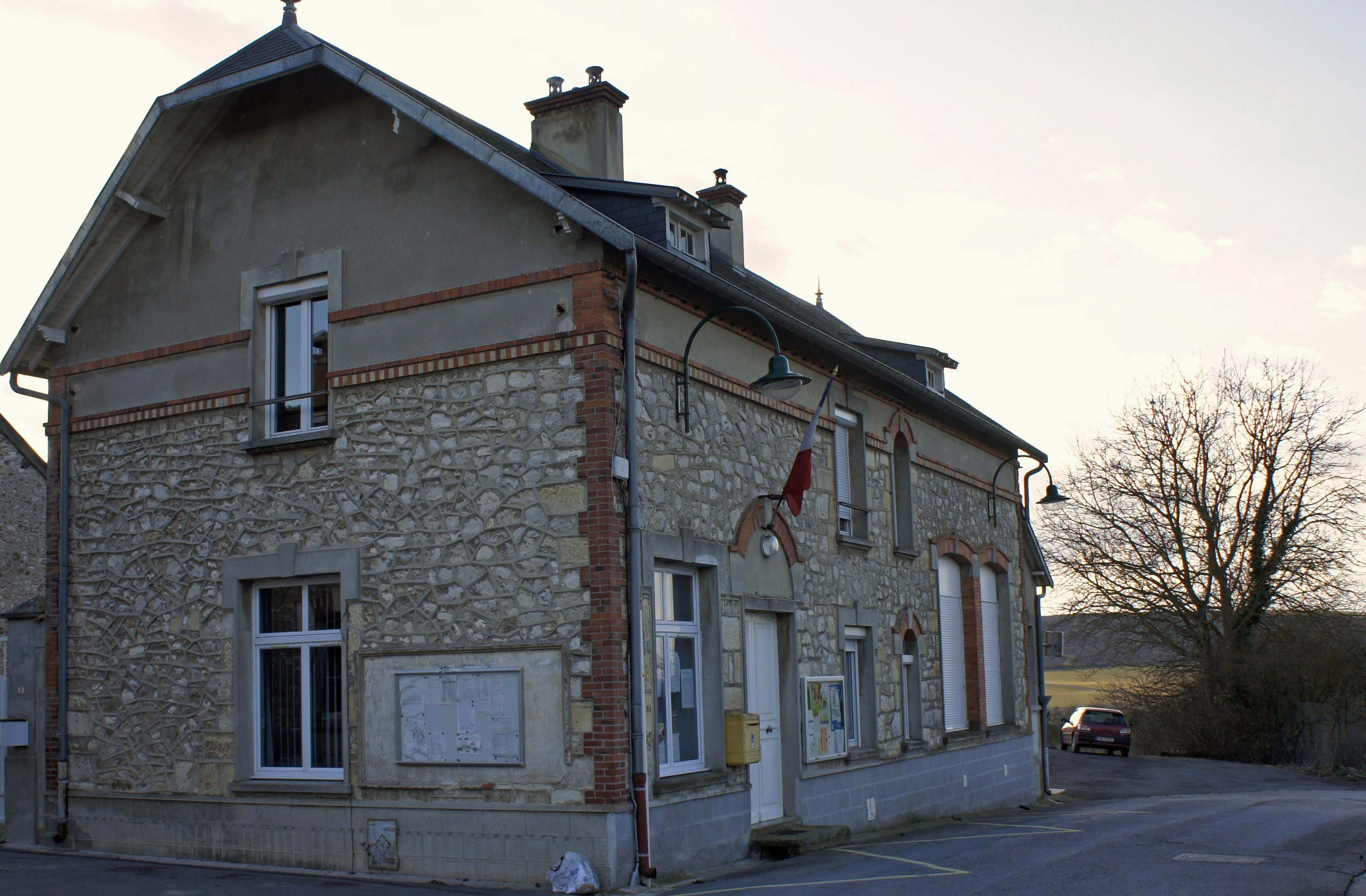
- The town hall in Bligny
- Location of Bligny
- Location within France Location within Grand Est
- Coordinates: 49°11′45″N 3°51′41″E
- Country: France
- Region: Grand Est
- Department: Marne
- Arrondissement: Reims
- Canton: Dormans-Paysages de Champagne
- Intercommunality: CU Grand Reims

Government
  - Mayor (2024–2026): André Lemaire
- Area^{1}: 2.59 km^{2} (1.00 sq mi)
- Elevation: 148 m (486 ft)
- Population (2023): 107
  - Density: 41.3/km^{2} (107/sq mi)
- Time zone: UTC+01:00 (CET)
  - Summer (DST): UTC+02:00 (CEST)
- INSEE/Postal code: 51069 /51170
- ^{1} French Land Register data, which excludes lakes, ponds, glaciers > 1 km^{2} (0.386 sq mi or 247 acres) and river estuaries.

Bligny (French pronunciation: [bliɲi]) is a commune of the Marne department in northeastern France.

== Population ==
Historical population
Year	Pop.	±% p.a.
1968	56	—
1975	89	+6.84%
1982	101	+1.82%
1990	102	+0.12%
1999	89	−1.50%
2007	109	+2.57%
2012	113	+0.72%
2017	122	+1.54%
2023	107	−2.16%
Source: INSEE

== See also ==
- Communes of the Marne department
- Montagne de Reims Regional Natural Park
