= Poilly =

- Commune
- Location of Poilly
- Location within France Location within Grand Est
- Coordinates: 49°13′00″N 3°49′18″E
- Country: France
- Region: Grand Est
- Department: Marne
- Arrondissement: Reims
- Canton: Dormans-Paysages de Champagne
- Intercommunality: CU Grand Reims

Government
  - Mayor (2020–2026): Alain De Ceuleneer
- Area^{1}: 4.45 km^{2} (1.72 sq mi)
- Elevation: 105 m (344 ft)
- Population (2023): 94
  - Density: 21/km^{2} (55/sq mi)
- Time zone: UTC+01:00 (CET)
  - Summer (DST): UTC+02:00 (CEST)
- INSEE/Postal code: 51437 /51170
- ^{1} French Land Register data, which excludes lakes, ponds, glaciers > 1 km^{2} (0.386 sq mi or 247 acres) and river estuaries.

Poilly (French pronunciation: [pwaji]) is a commune in the Marne department in north-eastern France.

== See also ==
- Communes of the Marne department
- Montagne de Reims Regional Natural Park
