= Pourcy =

- Commune
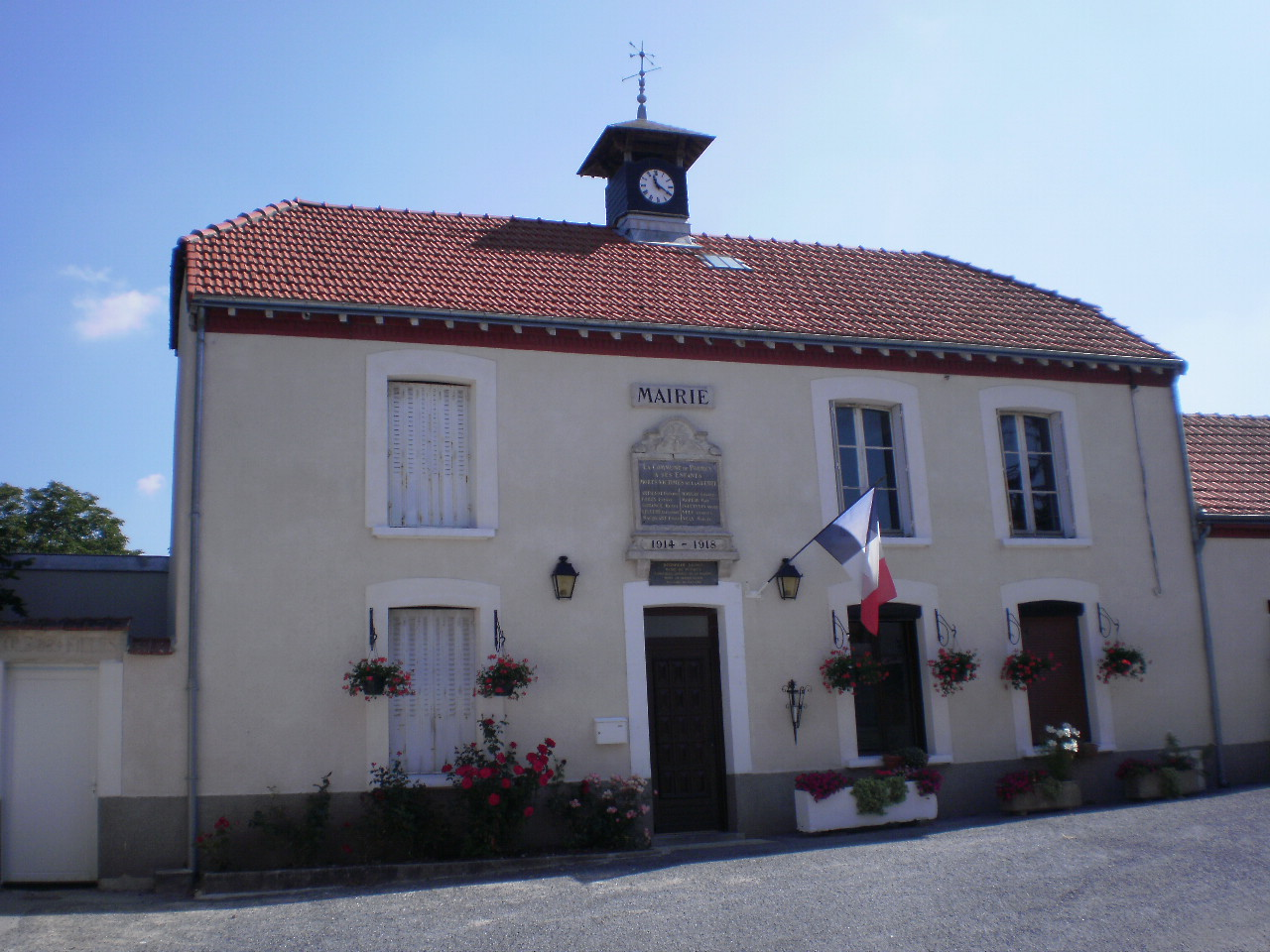
- The town hall in Pourcy

- Coat of arms
- Location of Pourcy
- Location within France Location within Grand Est
- Coordinates: 49°09′27″N 3°54′57″E
- Country: France
- Region: Grand Est
- Department: Marne
- Arrondissement: Reims
- Canton: Dormans-Paysages de Champagne
- Intercommunality: CU Grand Reims

Government
  - Mayor (2020–2026): Jean-Louis Farard
- Area^{1}: 8.35 km^{2} (3.22 sq mi)
- Elevation: 139 m (456 ft)
- Highest elevation: 263 m (863 ft)
- Lowest elevation: 138 m (453 ft)
- Population (2023): 194
  - Density: 23.2/km^{2} (60.2/sq mi)
- Time zone: UTC+01:00 (CET)
  - Summer (DST): UTC+02:00 (CEST)
- INSEE/Postal code: 51445 /51480
- ^{1} French Land Register data, which excludes lakes, ponds, glaciers > 1 km^{2} (0.386 sq mi or 247 acres) and river estuaries.

Pourcy (French pronunciation: [puʁsi]) is a commune in the Marne department in north-eastern France.

== See also ==
- Communes of the Marne department
- Montagne de Reims Regional Natural Park
