= Chaumuzy =

- Commune
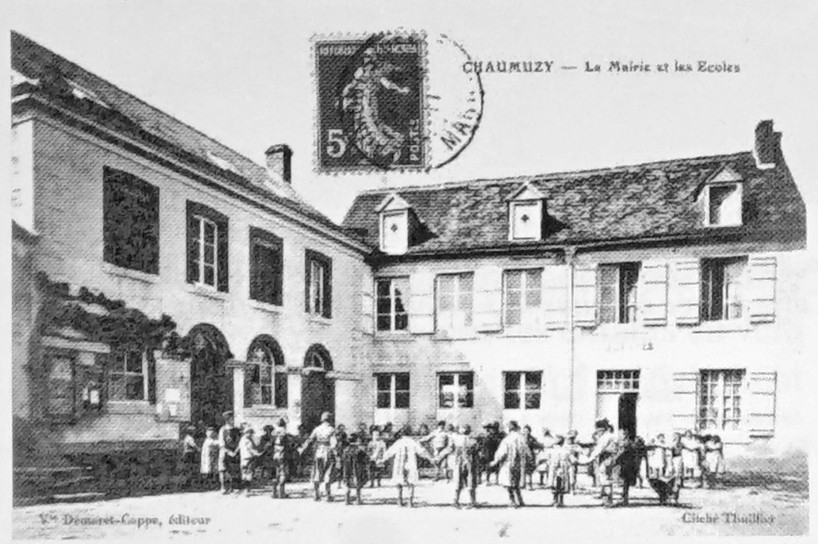
- The town hall and school in the early 20th century

- Coat of arms
- Location of Chaumuzy
- Location within France Location within Grand Est
- Coordinates: 49°10′33″N 3°51′54″E
- Country: France
- Region: Grand Est
- Department: Marne
- Arrondissement: Reims
- Canton: Dormans-Paysages de Champagne
- Intercommunality: CU Grand Reims

Government
  - Mayor (2020–2026): Sébastien Dole
- Area^{1}: 19.94 km^{2} (7.70 sq mi)
- Elevation: 133 m (436 ft)
- Population (2023): 345
  - Density: 17.3/km^{2} (44.8/sq mi)
- Time zone: UTC+01:00 (CET)
  - Summer (DST): UTC+02:00 (CEST)
- INSEE/Postal code: 51140 /51170
- ^{1} French Land Register data, which excludes lakes, ponds, glaciers > 1 km^{2} (0.386 sq mi or 247 acres) and river estuaries.

Chaumuzy (French pronunciation: [ʃomyzi]) is a commune in the Marne department in north-eastern France.

== See also ==
- Communes of the Marne department
- Montagne de Reims Regional Natural Park
