= Jonquery =

- Commune
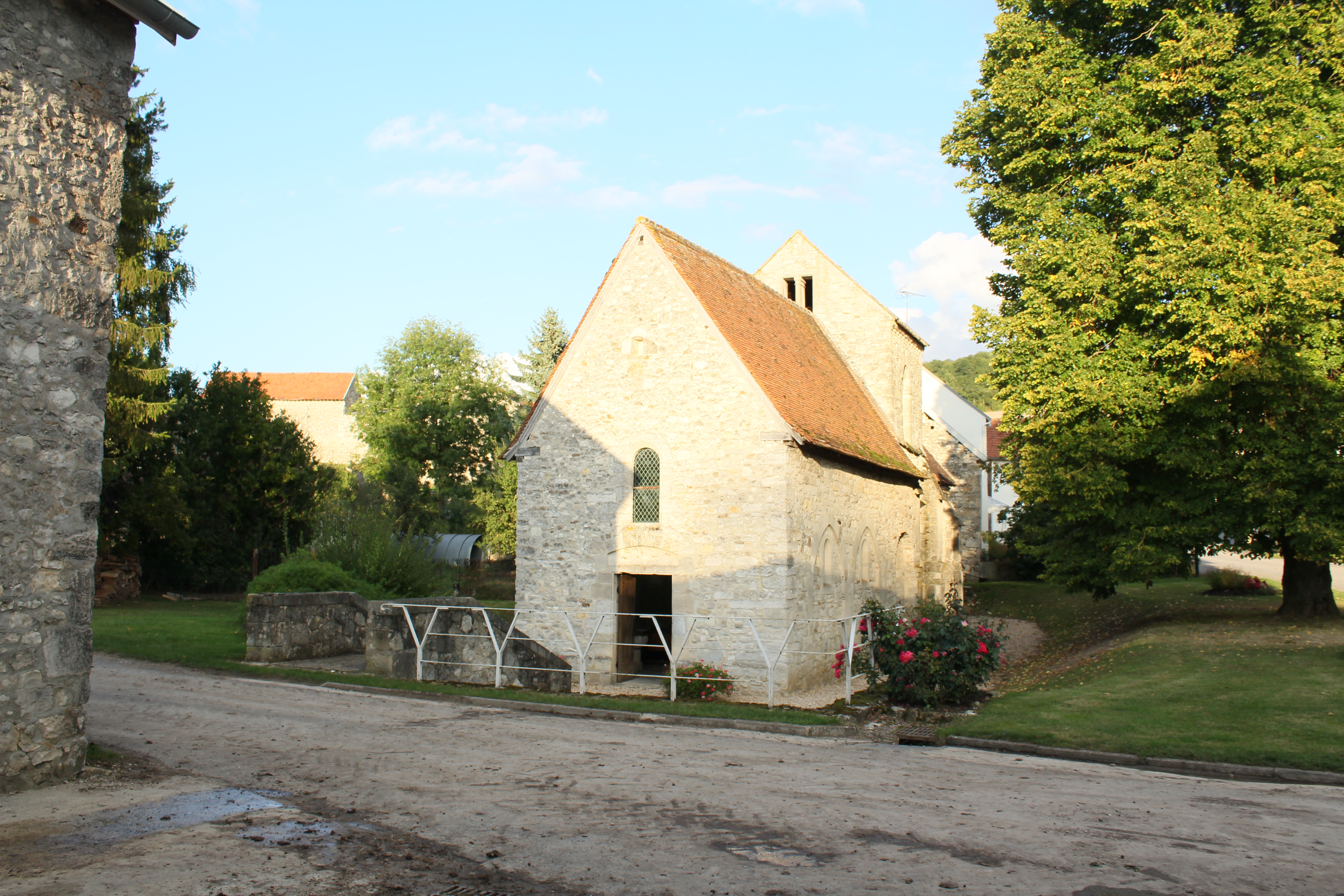
- The church in Jonquery
- Location of Jonquery
- Location within France Location within Grand Est
- Coordinates: 49°08′46″N 3°47′29″E
- Country: France
- Region: Grand Est
- Department: Marne
- Arrondissement: Reims
- Canton: Dormans-Paysages de Champagne
- Intercommunality: CU Grand Reims

Government
  - Mayor (2020–2026): Éric Ammeux
- Area^{1}: 4.34 km^{2} (1.68 sq mi)
- Elevation: 148 m (486 ft)
- Population (2023): 115
  - Density: 26.5/km^{2} (68.6/sq mi)
- Time zone: UTC+01:00 (CET)
  - Summer (DST): UTC+02:00 (CEST)
- INSEE/Postal code: 51309 /51700
- ^{1} French Land Register data, which excludes lakes, ponds, glaciers > 1 km^{2} (0.386 sq mi or 247 acres) and river estuaries.

Jonquery (French pronunciation: [ʒɔ̃kʁi]) is a commune in the Marne department in north-eastern France.

== See also ==
- Communes of the Marne department
- Montagne de Reims Regional Natural Park
