= Cormoyeux =

- Commune
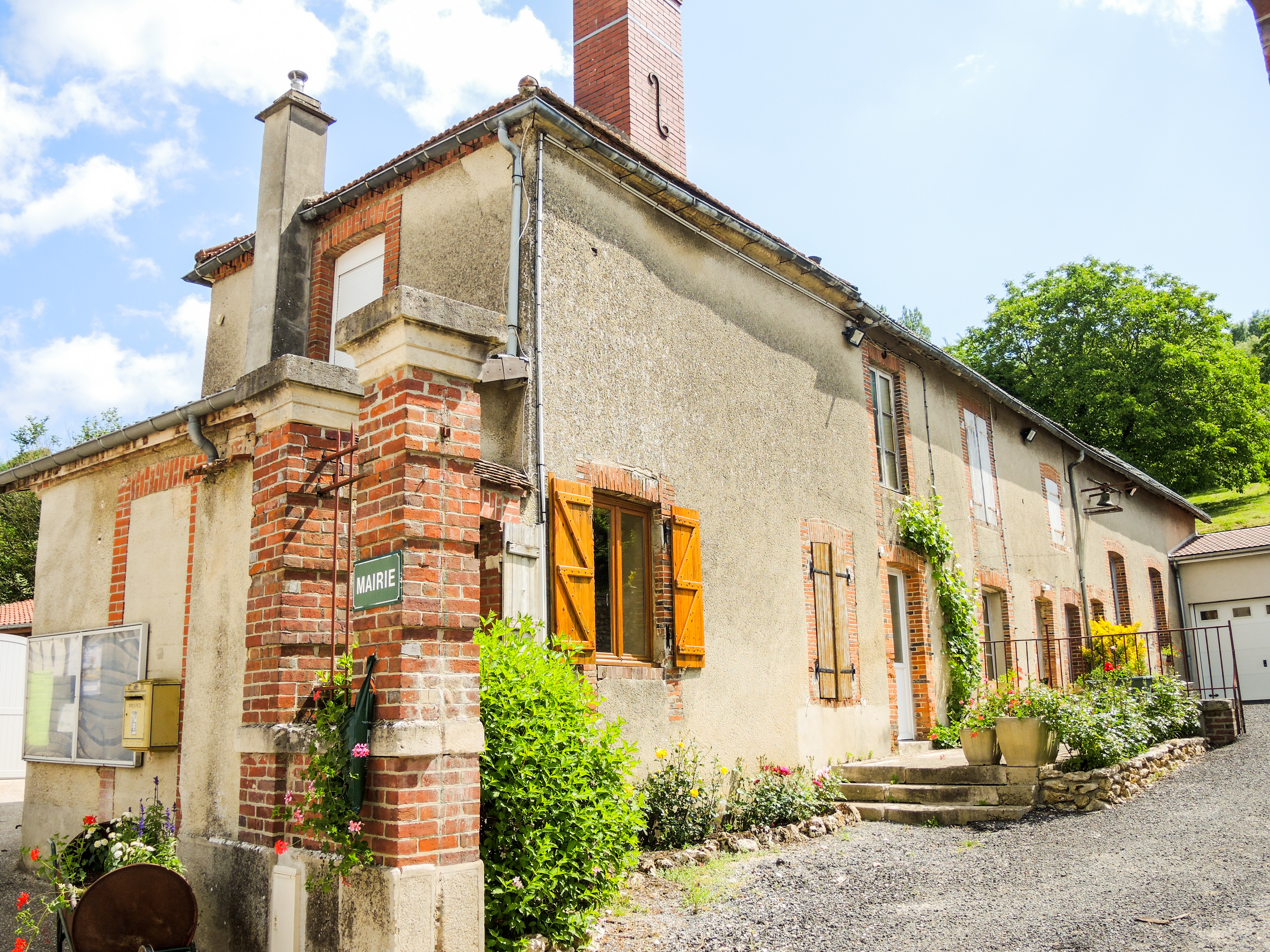
- The town hall in Cormoyeux
- Location of Cormoyeux
- Location within France Location within Grand Est
- Coordinates: 49°06′36″N 3°54′54″E
- Country: France
- Region: Grand Est
- Department: Marne
- Arrondissement: Épernay
- Canton: Dormans-Paysages de Champagne
- Intercommunality: Paysages de la Champagne

Government
  - Mayor (2020–2026): Jacky Bochet
- Area^{1}: 2.17 km^{2} (0.84 sq mi)
- Elevation: 210 m (690 ft)
- Population (2023): 129
  - Density: 59.4/km^{2} (154/sq mi)
- Time zone: UTC+01:00 (CET)
  - Summer (DST): UTC+02:00 (CEST)
- INSEE/Postal code: 51173 /51480
- ^{1} French Land Register data, which excludes lakes, ponds, glaciers > 1 km^{2} (0.386 sq mi or 247 acres) and river estuaries.

Cormoyeux (French pronunciation: [kɔʁmwajø]) is a commune in the Marne department in north-eastern France.

== See also ==
- Communes of the Marne department
- Montagne de Reims Regional Natural Park
