= Cœur-de-la-Vallée =

- Commune
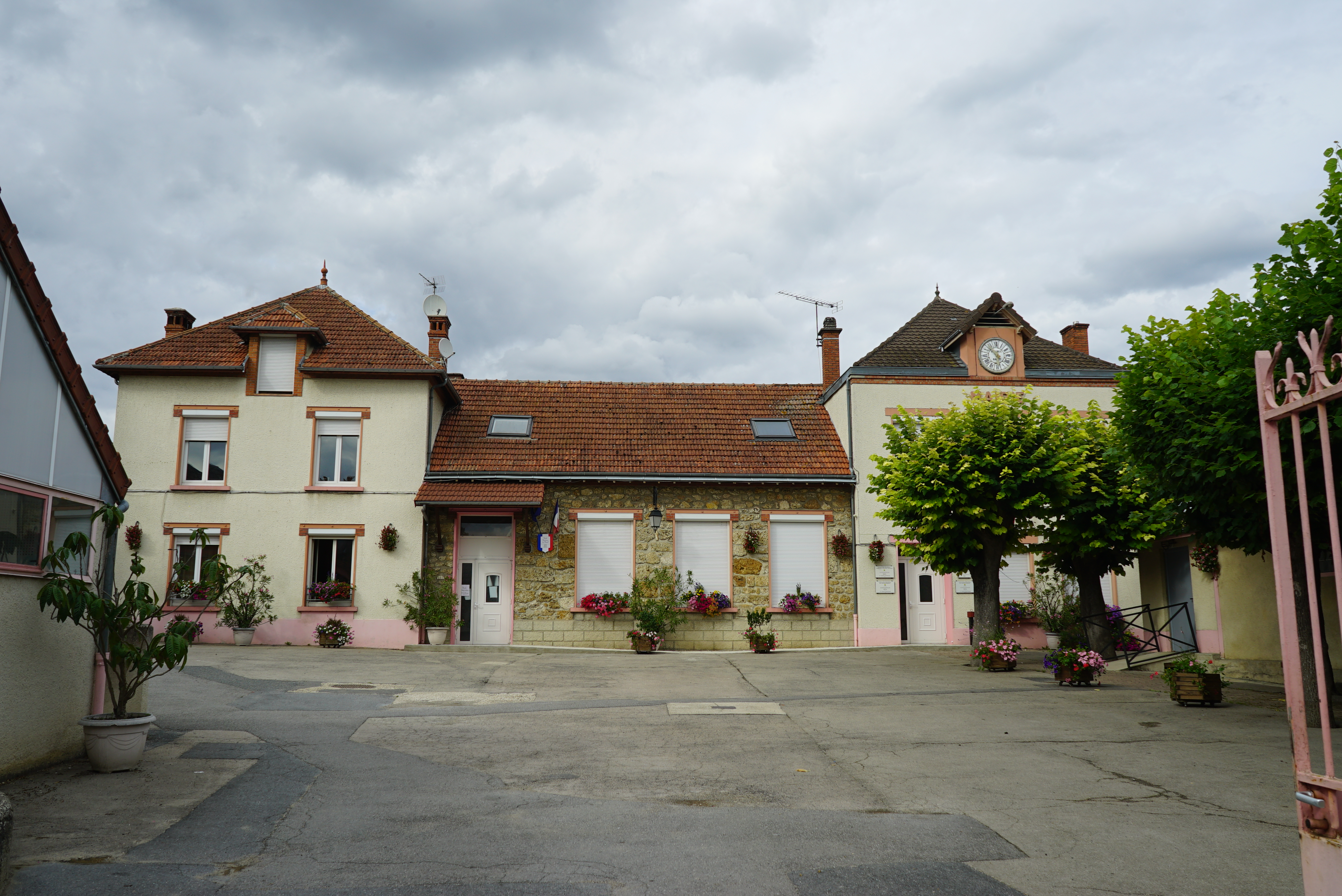
- The town hall in Reuil
- Location of Cœur-de-la-Vallée
- Location within France Location within Grand Est
- Coordinates: 49°04′59″N 3°48′02″E
- Country: France
- Region: Grand Est
- Department: Marne
- Arrondissement: Épernay
- Canton: Dormans-Paysages de Champagne
- Intercommunality: CC Paysages de la Champagne

Government
  - Mayor (2023–2026): David Quatrevaux
- Area^{1}: 13.59 km^{2} (5.25 sq mi)
- Elevation: 67 m (220 ft)
- Population (2023): 642
  - Density: 47.2/km^{2} (122/sq mi)
- Time zone: UTC+01:00 (CET)
  - Summer (DST): UTC+02:00 (CEST)
- INSEE/Postal code: 51457 /51480
- ^{1} French Land Register data, which excludes lakes, ponds, glaciers > 1 km^{2} (0.386 sq mi or 247 acres) and river estuaries.

Cœur-de-la-Vallée (French pronunciation: [kœʁ də la vale]) is a commune in the Marne department in north-eastern France. It was established as a commune nouvelle on 1 January 2023 from the merger of the communes of Binson-et-Orquigny, Reuil and Villers-sous-Châtillon.

== See also ==
- Communes of the Marne department
