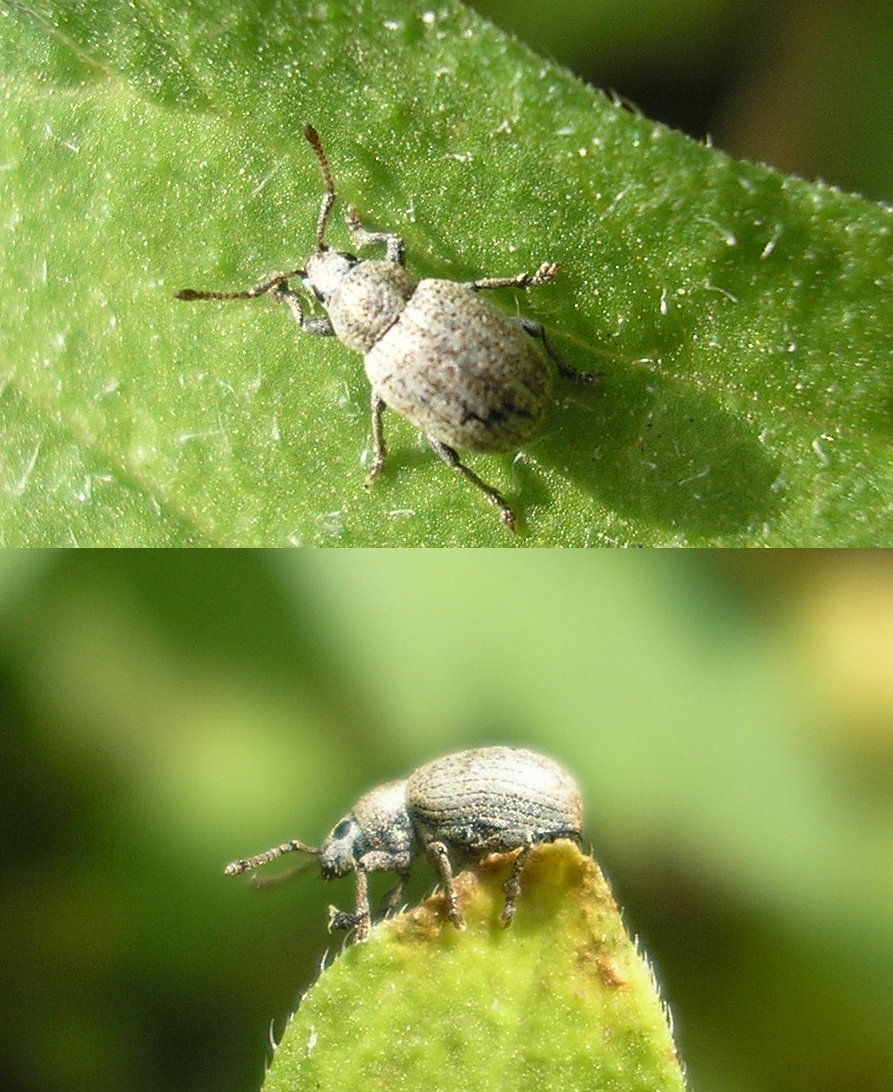
- Centricnemus leucogrammus

Scientific classification
- Domain: Eukaryota
- Kingdom: Animalia
- Phylum: Arthropoda
- Class: Insecta
- Order: Coleoptera
- Suborder: Polyphaga
- Infraorder: Cucujiformia
- Family: Curculionidae
- Subfamily: Entiminae
- Tribe: Peritelini; Lacordaire, 1863

Genera
- See text

= Peritelini =

Tribe of beetles

Peritelini is a weevil tribe in the subfamily Entiminae.

== Genera ==
Afrotroglorrhynchus – Anchitelus – Antispyris – Aparasystates – Aperitelus – Apotmetus – Aragnomus – Asceparnus – Aseneciobius – Caenopsis – Caterectus – Centricnemus – Diaecoderus – Dolichomeira – Drouetius – Dysommatus – Dysticheus – Epactus – Eporeorrhinus – Eucilinus – Eucyllus – Fernandius – Geodercodes – Gymnomorphus – Heisonyx – Heteromeira – Hobarypeithes – Isanates – Isaniris – Lalagetes – Leplospyris – Lepretius – Leptomeira – Leptosphaerotus – Leptospyridus – Liosystates – Mazuranella – Meira – Meirella – Mesoleurus – Mitophorus – Nematocerus – Nemocestes – Neomias – Neoperitelinus – Opseobarypeithes – Oreorrhinus – Oreosecus – Oreosystates – Orthoptochus – Palaepus – Paraptochus – Parasystates – Parasystatiella – Peritelinus – Peritelodes – Peritelopsis – Peritelus – Phoromitus – Platypterocis – Pseudomeira – Rhypodillus – Ripetelus – Seneciobius – Simo –Solariola – Stenoptochus – Stomodes – Stomodesops – Strictoseneciobius – Subleptospyris – Systaniris – Systates – Systatodes – Therapontigonus – Thinoxenus – Thompsonanthus – Thricolepis – Xestorhinus
