= Drouet =

Drouet is a surname, and may refer to:

- Aristide Drouet (1903–1949), French cyclist
- Arnaud Drouet (born 1973), French short track speed skater
- Francis Elliott Drouet (1907–1982), American botanist and museum curator
- Jean-Baptiste Drouet, Comte d'Erlon, French soldier in the Napoleonic Wars
- Jean-Baptiste Drouet (revolutionary), French politician at the time of the 1789 Revolution
- Jean-Pierre Drouet (born 1935), French percussionist and composer
- Juliette Drouet, French actress and mistress of Victor Hugo
- Laure Drouet (born 1970), French short track speed skater
- Louis Drouet, 19th-century French classical flautist
- Marie Drouet (1885–1963), French heroine of World War I
- Minou Drouet, French poet, musician and actor
- Robert Drouet, American actor and playwright
- Thomas Drouet (born 1998), French racing driver
