= Drouetius =

Scientific classification
- Domain: Eukaryota
- Kingdom: Animalia
- Phylum: Arthropoda
- Class: Insecta
- Order: Coleoptera
- Suborder: Polyphaga
- Infraorder: Cucujiformia
- Family: Curculionidae
- Tribe: Peritelini
- Genus: Drouetius; Méquignon, 1942

Genus of beetles

Drouetius is a genus of true weevils (family Curculionidae). It has three described species, all of them from the Azores archipelago.

== Species ==
- Drouetius azoricus (Drouet, 1859)
- Drouetius borgesi Machado, 2009
- Drouetius oceanicus Machado, 2009
