= Peritelodes =

Scientific classification
- Kingdom: Animalia
- Phylum: Arthropoda
- Class: Insecta
- Order: Coleoptera
- Suborder: Polyphaga
- Infraorder: Cucujiformia
- Family: Curculionidae
- Tribe: Peritelini
- Genus: Peritelodes; Casey, 1888

Genus of beetles

Peritelodes is a genus of broad-nosed weevils in the beetle family Curculionidae. There is at least one described species in Peritelodes, P. obtectus.
