= Thricolepis inornata =

Scientific classification
- Domain: Eukaryota
- Kingdom: Animalia
- Phylum: Arthropoda
- Class: Insecta
- Order: Coleoptera
- Suborder: Polyphaga
- Infraorder: Cucujiformia
- Family: Curculionidae
- Genus: Thricolepis
- Species: T. inornata

Binomial name
- Thricolepis inornata Horn, 1876

Species of beetle

Thricolepis inornata is a species of broad-nosed weevil in the beetle family Curculionidae. It is found in North America.
