= Eucilinus aridus =

Scientific classification
- Domain: Eukaryota
- Kingdom: Animalia
- Phylum: Arthropoda
- Class: Insecta
- Order: Coleoptera
- Suborder: Polyphaga
- Infraorder: Cucujiformia
- Family: Curculionidae
- Genus: Eucilinus
- Species: E. aridus

Binomial name
- Eucilinus aridus (Van Dyke, 1938)

Synonyms
- Eucyllus tinkhami Tanner, 1959

Species of beetle

Eucilinus aridus is a species of broad-nosed weevil in the beetle family Curculionidae. It is found in North America.

== Subspecies ==
These two subspecies belong to the species Eucilinus aridus:

- Eucilinus aridus aridus^{g}
- Eucilinus aridus tinkhami (Tanner, 1959)^{c g}

Data sources: i = ITIS, c = Catalogue of Life, g = GBIF, b = Bugguide.net
