= Chartèves =

- Commune
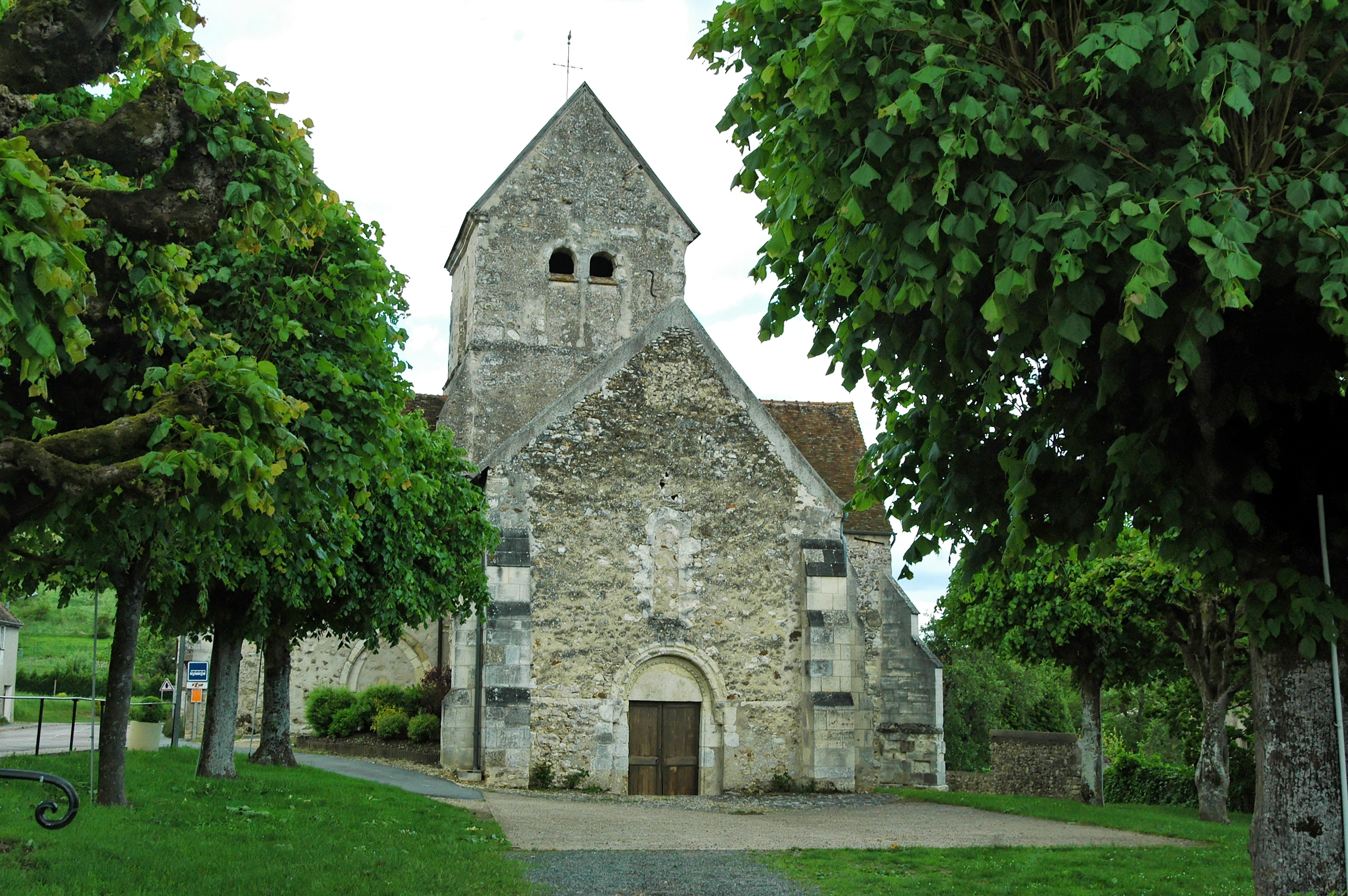
- The church of Chartèves
- Location of Chartèves
- Location within France Location within Hauts-de-France
- Coordinates: 49°04′33″N 3°30′20″E
- Country: France
- Region: Hauts-de-France
- Department: Aisne
- Arrondissement: Château-Thierry
- Canton: Essômes-sur-Marne
- Intercommunality: CA Région de Château-Thierry

Government
  - Mayor (2026–32): Pascal Richard
- Area^{1}: 8.76 km^{2} (3.38 sq mi)
- Highest elevation: 221 m (725 ft)
- Lowest elevation: 62 m (203 ft)
- Population (2023): 361
  - Density: 41.2/km^{2} (107/sq mi)
- Time zone: UTC+01:00 (CET)
  - Summer (DST): UTC+02:00 (CEST)
- INSEE/Postal code: 02166 /02400
- ^{1} French Land Register data, which excludes lakes, ponds, glaciers > 1 km^{2} (0.386 sq mi or 247 acres) and river estuaries.

Chartèves (French pronunciation: [ʃaʁtɛv]) is a commune in the Aisne department in Hauts-de-France in northern France.

== Population ==
Historical population
Year	Pop.	±% p.a.
1968	226	—
1975	235	+0.56%
1982	252	+1.00%
1990	303	+2.33%
1999	370	+2.24%
2007	358	−0.41%
2012	359	+0.06%
2017	352	−0.39%
2023	361	+0.42%
Source: INSEE

== Culture ==
=== Personalities ===
- Amédée Féau (1872-1952) resided here
- Marie Drouet (1885-1963) was born here
- Léon Augustin Lhermitte (1844-1925) painted the landscapes of the village

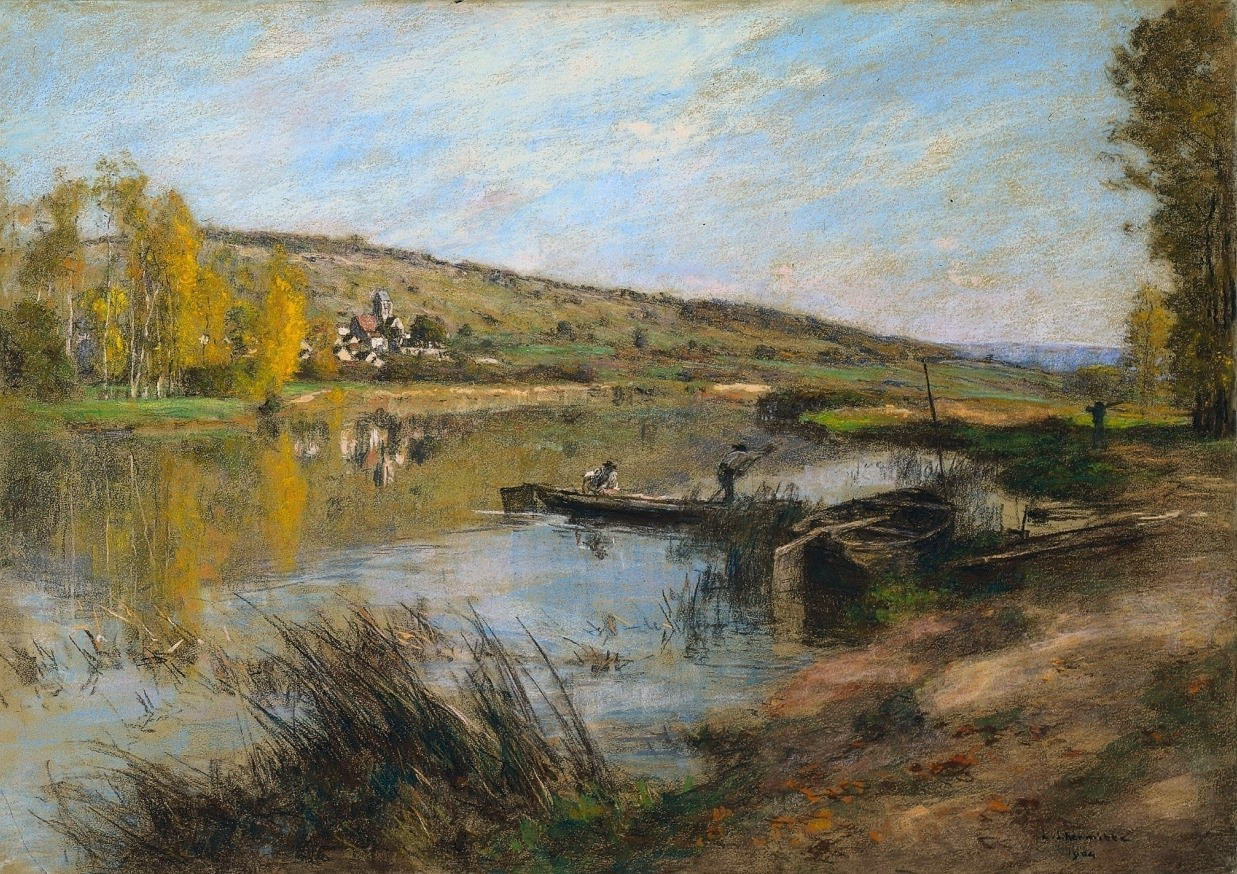
Léon Augustin Lhermitte, La Marne à Chartèves (Marne in Chartèves), 1904, Cleveland Museum of Art

.

== See also ==
- Communes of the Aisne department
