= Geodercodes =

Scientific classification
- Kingdom: Animalia
- Phylum: Arthropoda
- Class: Insecta
- Order: Coleoptera
- Suborder: Polyphaga
- Infraorder: Cucujiformia
- Family: Curculionidae
- Tribe: Peritelini
- Genus: Geodercodes; Casey, 1888

Genus of beetles

Geodercodes is a genus of broad-nosed weevils in the beetle family Curculionidae. There are at least two described species in Geodercodes.

== Species ==
These two species belong to the genus Geodercodes:

- Geodercodes hispidus Horn, 1894^{i c g}
- Geodercodes latipennis Casey, 1888^{i c g b}

Data sources: i = ITIS, c = Catalogue of Life, g = GBIF, b = Bugguide.net
