= Peritelopsis =

Scientific classification
- Kingdom: Animalia
- Phylum: Arthropoda
- Class: Insecta
- Order: Coleoptera
- Suborder: Polyphaga
- Infraorder: Cucujiformia
- Family: Curculionidae
- Tribe: Peritelini
- Genus: Peritelopsis; Horn, 1876

Genus of beetles

Peritelopsis is a genus of broad-nosed weevils in the beetle family Curculionidae. There is at least one described species in Peritelopsis, P. globiventris.
