= Solariola =

Scientific classification
- Kingdom: Animalia
- Phylum: Arthropoda
- Class: Insecta
- Order: Coleoptera
- Suborder: Polyphaga
- Infraorder: Cucujiformia
- Family: Curculionidae
- Tribe: Peritelini
- Genus: Solariola; Flach, 1908

Species
- 43, see text.

Synonyms
- Solariella Flach, 1905

Genus of insects

Solariola is a genus of weevils in the family Curculionidae. The genus is endemic to Italy.

== Taxonomy ==
The genus was originally placed in the tribe Otiorhynchini, but it was moved to Peritelini on the basis of morphology. A 2019 study described 34 new species greatly increasing the genus size to 43 species.

== Species ==
There are currently 43 described species:

- Solariola angelae Baviera, 2015
- Solariola angelinii Bellò, Osella & Baviera, 2019
- Solariola benellii Bellò, Osella & Baviera, 2019
- Solariola bucolorum Bellò, Osella & Baviera, 2019
- Solariola cajetanibelloi Bellò, Osella & Baviera, 2019
- Solariola calida Bellò, Osella & Baviera, 2019
- Solariola comata Bellò, Osella & Baviera, 2019
- Solariola doderoi A. Solari & F. Solari, 1923
- Solariola diottii Bellò, Osella & Baviera, 2019
- Solariola fancelloi Bellò, Osella & Baviera, 2019
- Solariola forbixi Bellò, Osella & Baviera, 2019
- Solariola fraterna Baviera, 2015
- Solariola gestroi (A. Solari & F. Solari, 1903)
- Solariola gratiensis Bellò, Osella & Baviera, 2019
- Solariola hirtula (A. Solari & F. Solari, 1923)
- Solariola hyblensis Bellò, Osella & Baviera, 2019
- Solariola ientilei Bellò, Osella & Baviera, 2019
- Solariola margaritae Bellò, Osella & Baviera, 2019
- Solariola mariaeclarae Bellò, Osella & Baviera, 2019
- Solariola mariaesilvanae Bellò, Osella & Baviera, 2019
- Solariola mariaetheresiae Bellò, Osella & Baviera, 2019
- Solariola melonii Bellò, Osella & Baviera, 2019
- Solariola nemoralis Bellò, Osella & Baviera, 2019
- Solariola normanna Bellò, Osella & Baviera, 2019
- Solariola obsoleta Bellò, Osella & Baviera, 2019
- Solariola pacei Bellò, Osella & Baviera, 2019
- Solariola paganettii (Flach, 1905)
- Solariola paulimagrinii Bellò, Osella & Baviera, 2019
- Solariola pentaphyllica Bellò, Osella & Baviera, 2019
- Solariola pesarinii Baviera, 2015
- Solariola petriolii Bellò, Osella & Baviera, 2019
- Solariola poggii Bellò, Osella & Baviera, 2019
- Solariola raphaelis Bellò, Osella & Baviera, 2019
- Solariola rosae Bellò, Osella & Baviera, 2019
- Solariola ruffoi Osella & Di Marco, 1996
- Solariola sabellai Bellò, Osella & Baviera, 2019
- Solariola saccoi Bellò, Osella & Baviera, 2019
- Solariola sbordonii Bellò, Osella & Baviera, 2019
- Solariola selinusia Bellò, Osella & Baviera, 2019
- Solariola tedeschii Bellò, Osella & Baviera, 2019
- Solariola venusta Bellò, Osella & Baviera, 2019
- Solariola vitalei A. Solari & F. Solari, 1923
- Solariola zoiai Bellò, Osella & Baviera, 2019
