= Rhypodillus =

Scientific classification
- Kingdom: Animalia
- Phylum: Arthropoda
- Class: Insecta
- Order: Coleoptera
- Suborder: Polyphaga
- Infraorder: Cucujiformia
- Family: Curculionidae
- Tribe: Peritelini
- Genus: Rhypodillus; Cockerell, 1906

Genus of beetles

Rhypodillus is a genus of broad-nosed weevils in the beetle family Curculionidae. There are at least two described species in Rhypodillus.

== Species ==
These two species belong to the genus Rhypodillus:

- Rhypodillus brevicollis (Horn, 1876)^{i c g b}
- Rhypodillus dilatatus (Horn, 1876)^{i c g}

Data sources: i = ITIS, c = Catalogue of Life, g = GBIF, b = Bugguide.net
