= Saint-Brice-Courcelles =

- Commune
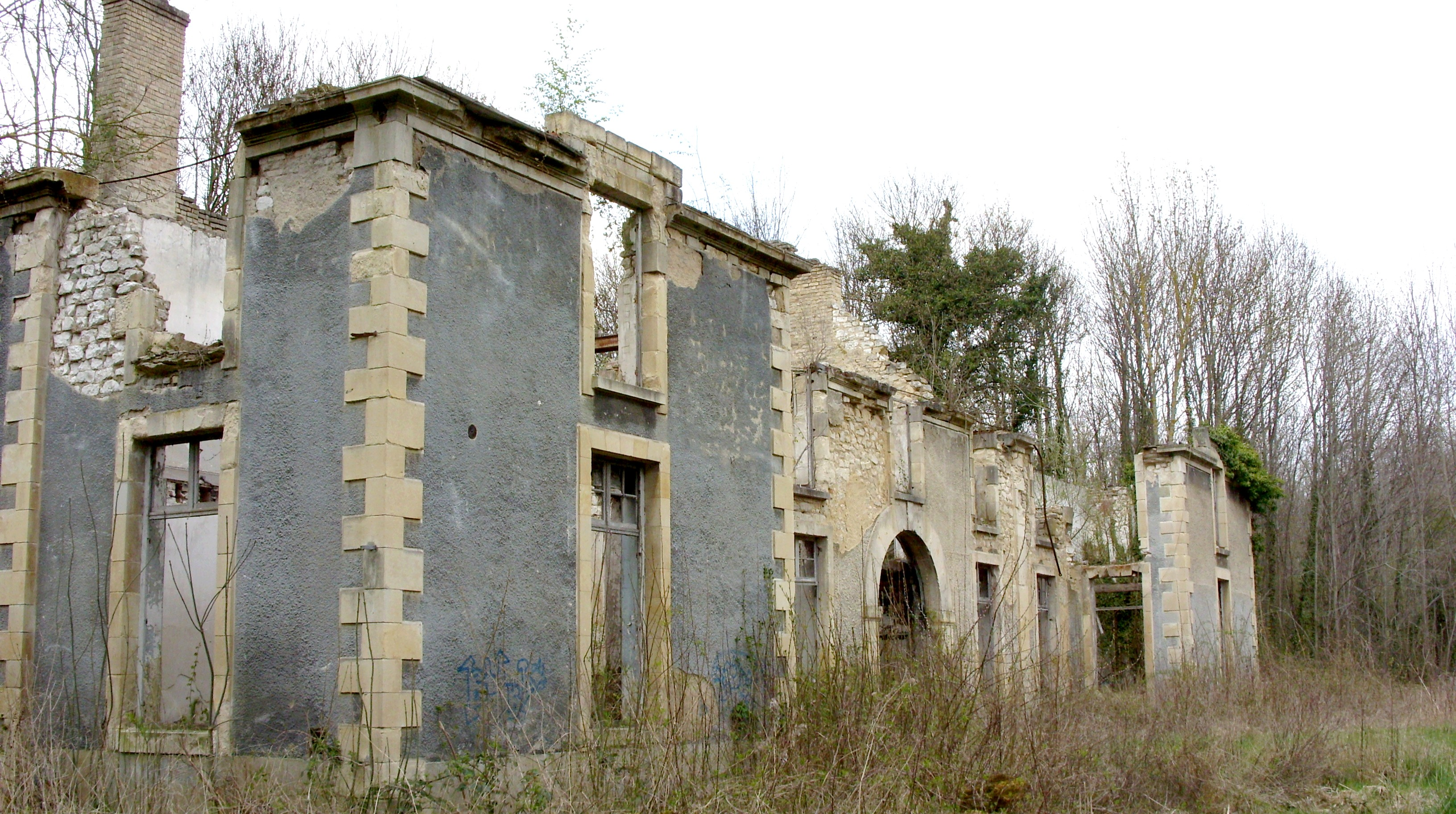
- Ruins of the Chateau of Malle
- Location of Saint-Brice-Courcelles
- Location within France Location within Grand Est
- Coordinates: 49°15′43″N 3°59′12″E
- Country: France
- Region: Grand Est
- Department: Marne
- Arrondissement: Reims
- Canton: Reims-5
- Intercommunality: CU Grand Reims

Government
  - Mayor (2020–2026): Evelyne Quentin
- Area^{1}: 4.16 km^{2} (1.61 sq mi)
- Elevation: 75 m (246 ft)
- Population (2023): 3,566
  - Density: 857/km^{2} (2,220/sq mi)
- Time zone: UTC+01:00 (CET)
  - Summer (DST): UTC+02:00 (CEST)
- INSEE/Postal code: 51474 /51370
- ^{1} French Land Register data, which excludes lakes, ponds, glaciers > 1 km^{2} (0.386 sq mi or 247 acres) and river estuaries.

Saint-Brice-Courcelles (French pronunciation: [sɛ̃ bʁis kuʁsɛl]) is a commune in the Marne department in north-eastern France. It is known for its architectural heritage and many castles.

Twinned with Robertsbridge East Sussex, England.

== Population ==
Historical population
Year	Pop.	±% p.a.
1968	1,553	—
1975	1,773	+1.91%
1982	2,425	+4.58%
1990	3,356	+4.15%
1999	3,527	+0.55%
2007	3,357	−0.62%
2012	3,425	+0.40%
2017	3,522	+0.56%
2023	3,566	+0.21%
Source: INSEE

== See also ==
- Communes of the Marne department
