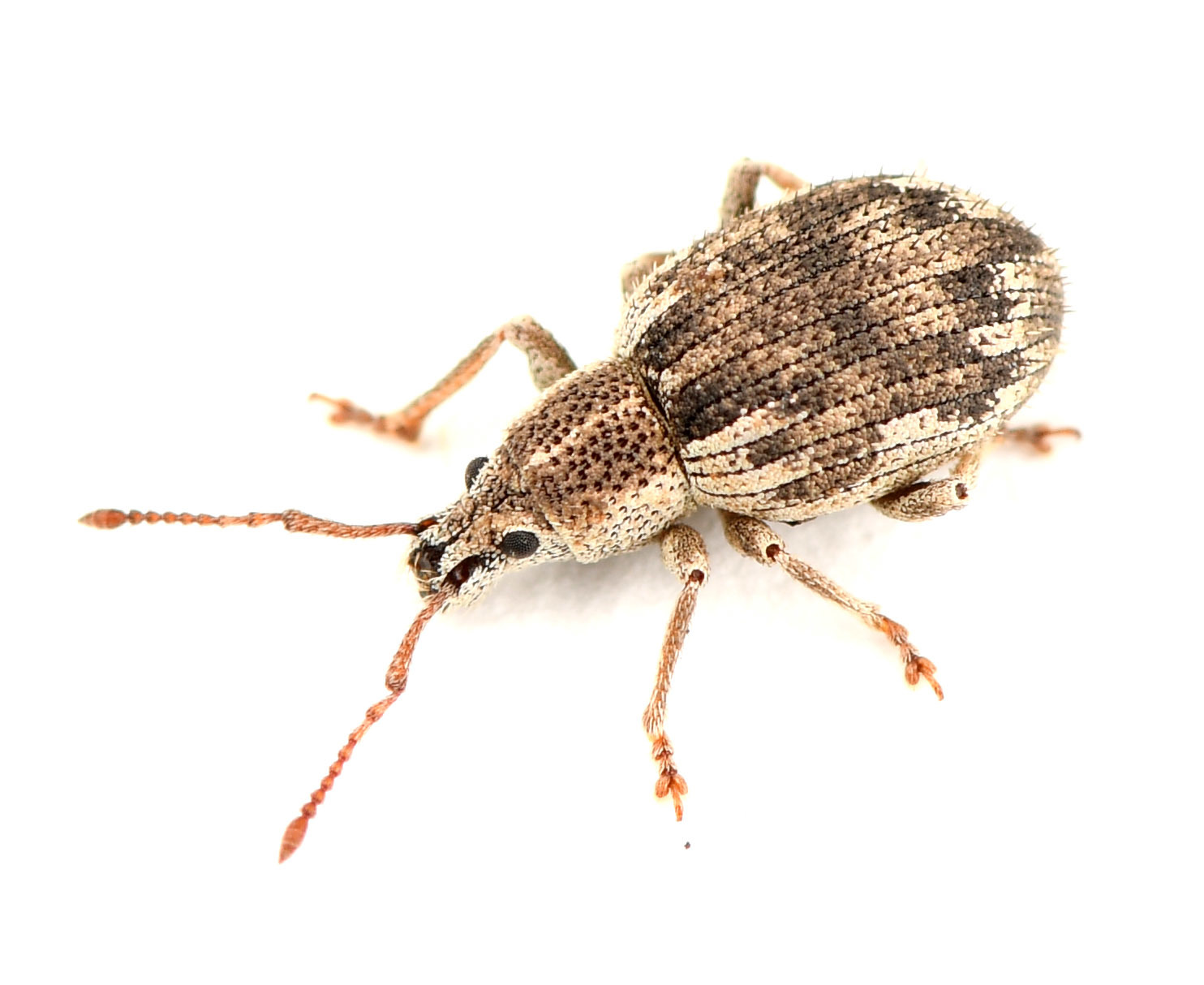
- Paraptochus oregonus, Oregon

Scientific classification
- Domain: Eukaryota
- Kingdom: Animalia
- Phylum: Arthropoda
- Class: Insecta
- Order: Coleoptera
- Suborder: Polyphaga
- Infraorder: Cucujiformia
- Family: Curculionidae
- Genus: Paraptochus
- Species: P. oregonus

Binomial name
- Paraptochus oregonus (Van Dyke, 1936)

Synonyms
- Peritelinus oregonus Van Dyke, 1936

= Paraptochus oregonus =

Species of beetle

Paraptochus oregonus is a species of weevils in the beetle family Curculionidae. It is found in Oregon and the Pacific Northwest.

Paraptochus oregonus is sometimes considered a member of the genus Peritelinus. The World Entiminae Database (August 2024), treats the genus Peritelinus as a synonym of Paraptochus, and the species of Peritelinus as members of Paraptochus.
