= Eucyllus =

Scientific classification
- Domain: Eukaryota
- Kingdom: Animalia
- Phylum: Arthropoda
- Class: Insecta
- Order: Coleoptera
- Suborder: Polyphaga
- Infraorder: Cucujiformia
- Family: Curculionidae
- Tribe: Peritelini
- Genus: Eucyllus; Horn, 1876

Genus of beetles

Eucyllus is a genus of broad-nosed weevils in the beetle family Curculionidae. There are about eight described species in Eucyllus.

== Species ==
These eight species belong to the genus Eucyllus:

- Eucyllus carinarostris Pelsue and Sleeper, 1972^{i c g}
- Eucyllus cinereus Pelsue and Sleeper, 1972^{i c g}
- Eucyllus echinus Van Dyke, 1936^{i c g}
- Eucyllus horridus Hatch, 1971^{i c g}
- Eucyllus nevadensis (Casey, 1888)^{i c g}
- Eucyllus saesariatus Pelsue & Sleeper, 1972^{i c g b}
- Eucyllus unicolor Van Dyke, 1936^{i c g}
- Eucyllus vagans Horn, 1876^{i c g b}

Data sources: i = ITIS, c = Catalogue of Life, g = GBIF, b = Bugguide.net
