= Stenoptochus =

Scientific classification
- Kingdom: Animalia
- Phylum: Arthropoda
- Class: Insecta
- Order: Coleoptera
- Suborder: Polyphaga
- Infraorder: Cucujiformia
- Family: Curculionidae
- Tribe: Peritelini
- Genus: Stenoptochus; Casey, 1888

Genus of beetles

Stenoptochus is a genus of broad-nosed weevils in the beetle family Curculionidae. There are at least two described species in Stenoptochus.

== Species ==
These two species belong to the genus Stenoptochus:

- Stenoptochus inconstans Casey, 1888^{i c g b}
- Stenoptochus vanduzeei Van Dyke, 1935^{i c g}

Data sources: i = ITIS, c = Catalogue of Life, g = GBIF, b = Bugguide.net
