= Geodercodes latipennis =

Scientific classification
- Kingdom: Animalia
- Phylum: Arthropoda
- Class: Insecta
- Order: Coleoptera
- Suborder: Polyphaga
- Infraorder: Cucujiformia
- Family: Curculionidae
- Genus: Geodercodes
- Species: G. latipennis

Binomial name
- Geodercodes latipennis Casey, 1888

Species of beetle

Geodercodes latipennis is a species of broad-nosed weevil in the beetle family Curculionidae. It is found in North America.
