= Dysticheus =

Scientific classification
- Domain: Eukaryota
- Kingdom: Animalia
- Phylum: Arthropoda
- Class: Insecta
- Order: Coleoptera
- Suborder: Polyphaga
- Infraorder: Cucujiformia
- Family: Curculionidae
- Tribe: Peritelini
- Genus: Dysticheus; Horn, 1876

Genus of broad-nosed weevils

Dysticheus is a genus of broad-nosed weevils in the beetle family Curculionidae. There are at least two described species in Dysticheus.

== Species ==
These two species belong to the genus Dysticheus:

- Dysticheus insignis Horn, 1876^{i c g b}
- Dysticheus rotundicollis Van Dyke, 1953^{i c g}

Data sources: i = ITIS, c = Catalogue of Life, g = GBIF, b = Bugguide.net
