= Stomodes gyrosicollis =

Scientific classification
- Kingdom: Animalia
- Phylum: Arthropoda
- Class: Insecta
- Order: Coleoptera
- Suborder: Polyphaga
- Infraorder: Cucujiformia
- Family: Curculionidae
- Genus: Stomodes
- Species: S. gyrosicollis

Binomial name
- Stomodes gyrosicollis Boheman, 1843

Species of beetle

Stomodes gyrosicollis is a species of broad-nosed weevil in the beetle family Curculionidae. It is found in North America.
