= Paraptochus setiferus =

Scientific classification
- Domain: Eukaryota
- Kingdom: Animalia
- Phylum: Arthropoda
- Class: Insecta
- Order: Coleoptera
- Suborder: Polyphaga
- Infraorder: Cucujiformia
- Family: Curculionidae
- Genus: Paraptochus
- Species: P. setiferus

Binomial name
- Paraptochus setiferus Van Dyke, 1935

Species of beetle

Paraptochus setiferus is a species of broad-nosed weevil in the beetle family Curculionidae. It is found in North America.
