= Stomodes =

Scientific classification
- Domain: Eukaryota
- Kingdom: Animalia
- Phylum: Arthropoda
- Class: Insecta
- Order: Coleoptera
- Suborder: Polyphaga
- Infraorder: Cucujiformia
- Family: Curculionidae
- Tribe: Peritelini
- Genus: Stomodes; Schönherr, 1826

Genus of beetles

Stomodes is a genus of broad-nosed weevils in the beetle family Curculionidae. There are about 11 described species in Stomodes.

== Species ==
These 11 species belong to the genus Stomodes:

- Stomodes convexicollis Miller, 1881^{c g}
- Stomodes ganglbaueri Wagner, 1912^{c g}
- Stomodes gyrosicollis Boheman, 1843^{i c g b}
- Stomodes leonhardi H. Wagner, 1912^{c g}
- Stomodes letzneri Reitter, 1889^{c g}
- Stomodes marocanus Hoffmann, 1957^{c g}
- Stomodes muelleri Lona, 1922^{c g}
- Stomodes periteliformis Reitter, 1915^{c g}
- Stomodes puncticollis Tournier, 1864^{c g}
- Stomodes rotundicollis Frivaldszky, 1880^{c g}
- Stomodes tolutarius Schoenherr, 1826^{c g}

Data sources: i = ITIS, c = Catalogue of Life, g = GBIF, b = Bugguide.net
