= Rhypodillus brevicollis =

Scientific classification
- Domain: Eukaryota
- Kingdom: Animalia
- Phylum: Arthropoda
- Class: Insecta
- Order: Coleoptera
- Suborder: Polyphaga
- Infraorder: Cucujiformia
- Family: Curculionidae
- Genus: Rhypodillus
- Species: R. brevicollis

Binomial name
- Rhypodillus brevicollis (Horn, 1876)

Species of beetle

Rhypodillus brevicollis is a species of broad-nosed weevil in the beetle family Curculionidae. It is found in North America.
