= Aragnomus =

Scientific classification
- Domain: Eukaryota
- Kingdom: Animalia
- Phylum: Arthropoda
- Class: Insecta
- Order: Coleoptera
- Suborder: Polyphaga
- Infraorder: Cucujiformia
- Family: Curculionidae
- Tribe: Peritelini
- Genus: Aragnomus; Horn, 1876

Genus of beetles

Aragnomus is a genus of broad-nosed weevils in the beetle family Curculionidae. There are at least three described species in Aragnomus.

== Species ==
These three species belong to the genus Aragnomus:

- Aragnomus griseus Horn, 1876^{i c g b}
- Aragnomus hispidulus Casey, 1888^{i c g}
- Aragnomus setosus Van Dyke, 1936^{i c g}

Data sources: i = ITIS, c = Catalogue of Life, g = GBIF, b = Bugguide.net
