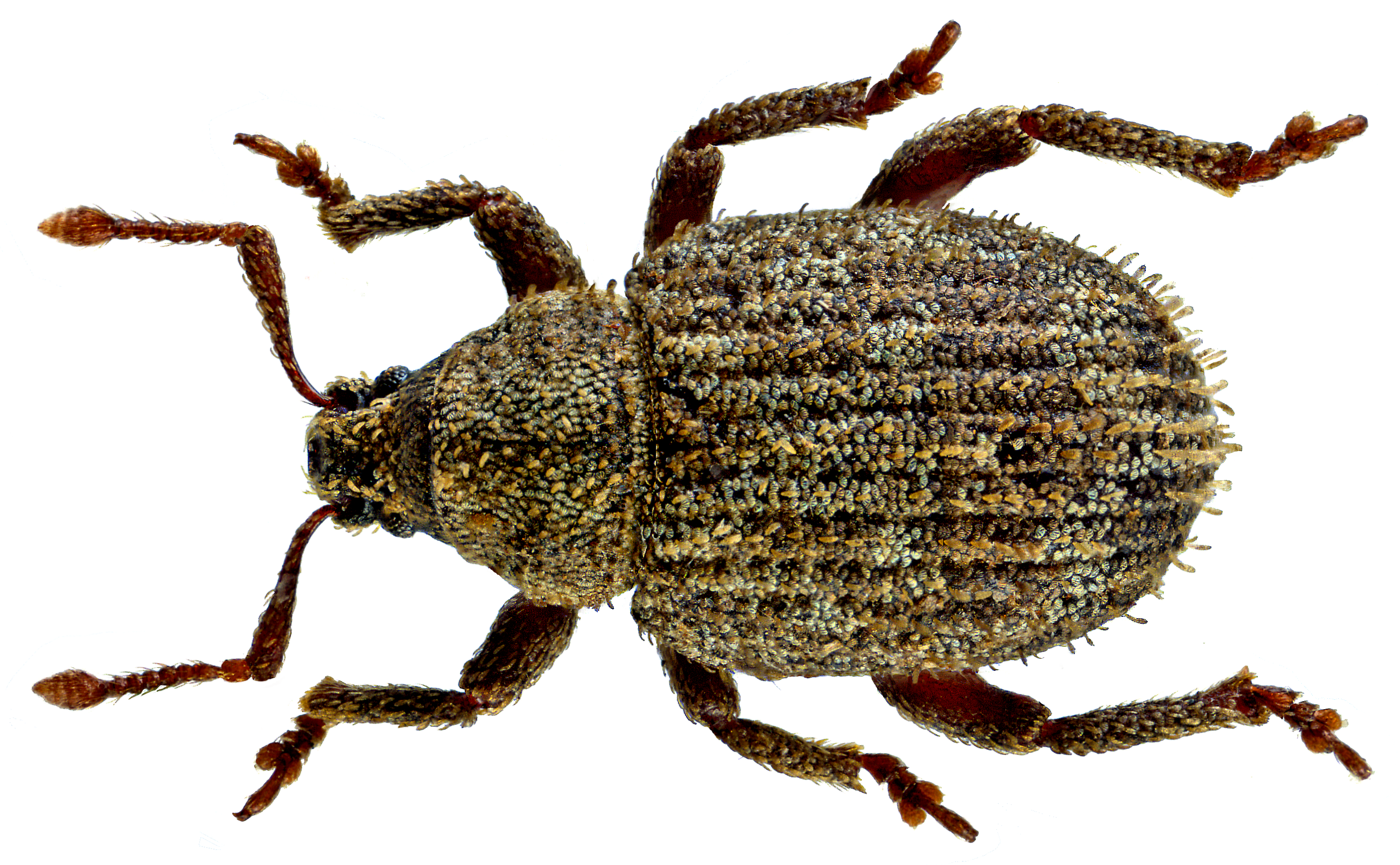

Scientific classification
- Kingdom: Animalia
- Phylum: Arthropoda
- Class: Insecta
- Order: Coleoptera
- Suborder: Polyphaga
- Infraorder: Cucujiformia
- Family: Curculionidae
- Genus: Caenopsis
- Species: C. waltoni

Binomial name
- Caenopsis waltoni (Boheman, 1843)

= Caenopsis waltoni =

Species of beetle

Caenopsis waltoni is a species of weevil native to Europe.
