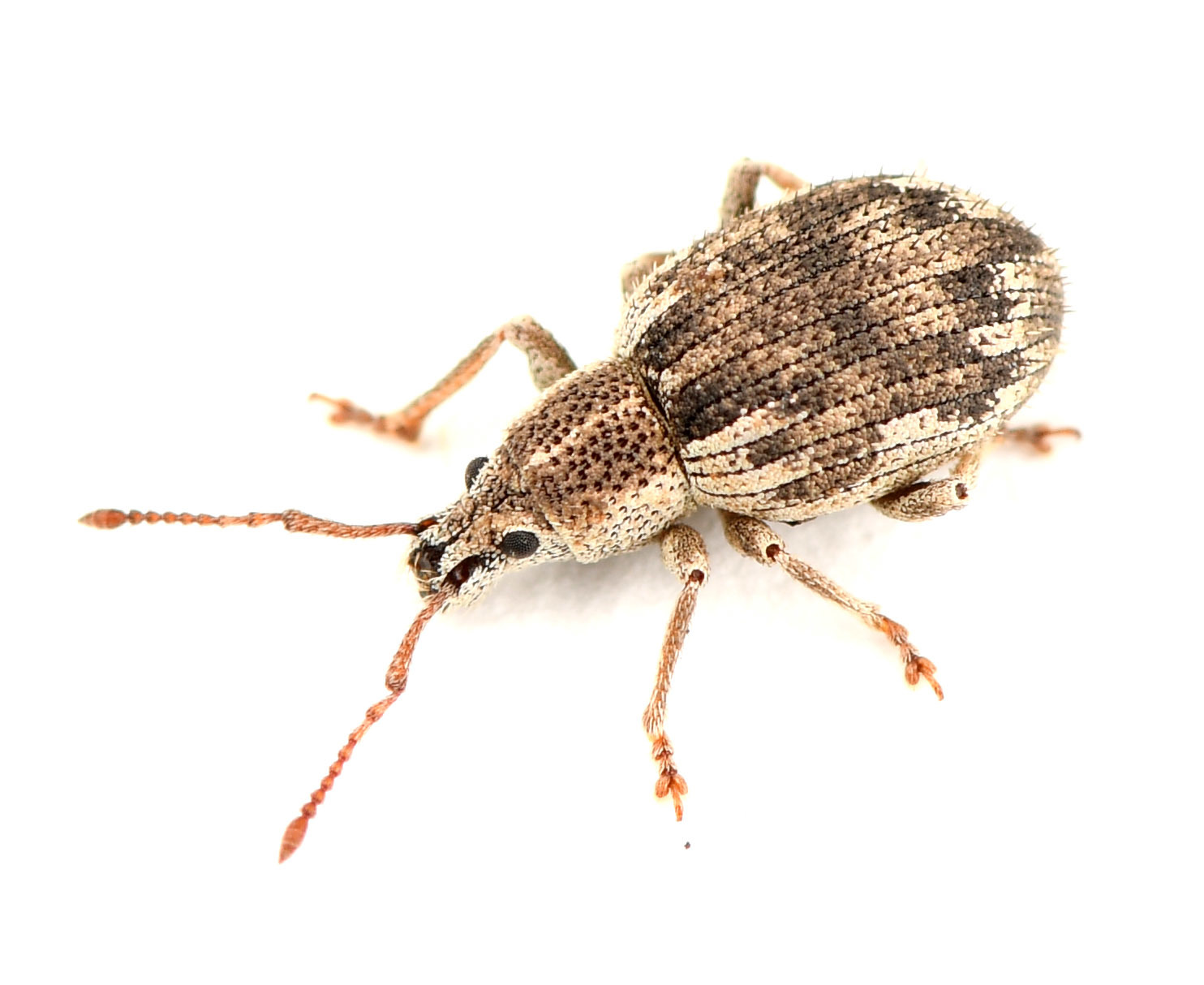
- Paraptochus oregonus, Oregon

Scientific classification
- Domain: Eukaryota
- Kingdom: Animalia
- Phylum: Arthropoda
- Class: Insecta
- Order: Coleoptera
- Suborder: Polyphaga
- Infraorder: Cucujiformia
- Family: Curculionidae
- Subfamily: Entiminae
- Tribe: Peritelini
- Genus: Paraptochus; Seidlitz, 1868

Synonyms
- Peritelinus Casey, 1888

= Paraptochus =

Genus of beetles

Paraptochus is a genus of Beetles (Weevils) in the beetle family Curculionidae. There are about six described species in Paraptochus.

Paraptochus oregonus and Paraptochus variegatus are sometimes considered members of the genus Peritelinus. The World Entiminae Database (August 2024), treats the genus Peritelinus as a synonym of Paraptochus, and the species of Peritelinus as members of Paraptochus.

== Species ==
These six species belong to the genus Paraptochus:

- Paraptochus erinaceus (Van Dyke, 1936)
- Paraptochus oregonus (Van Dyke, 1936)
- Paraptochus sellatus (Boheman, 1859) (Pacific Northwest)
- Paraptochus setiferus Van Dyke, 1935 (California)
- Paraptochus uniformis Van Dyke, 1935
- Paraptochus variegatus (Casey, 1888) (Pacific Northwest)
