= Bétheny =

- Commune
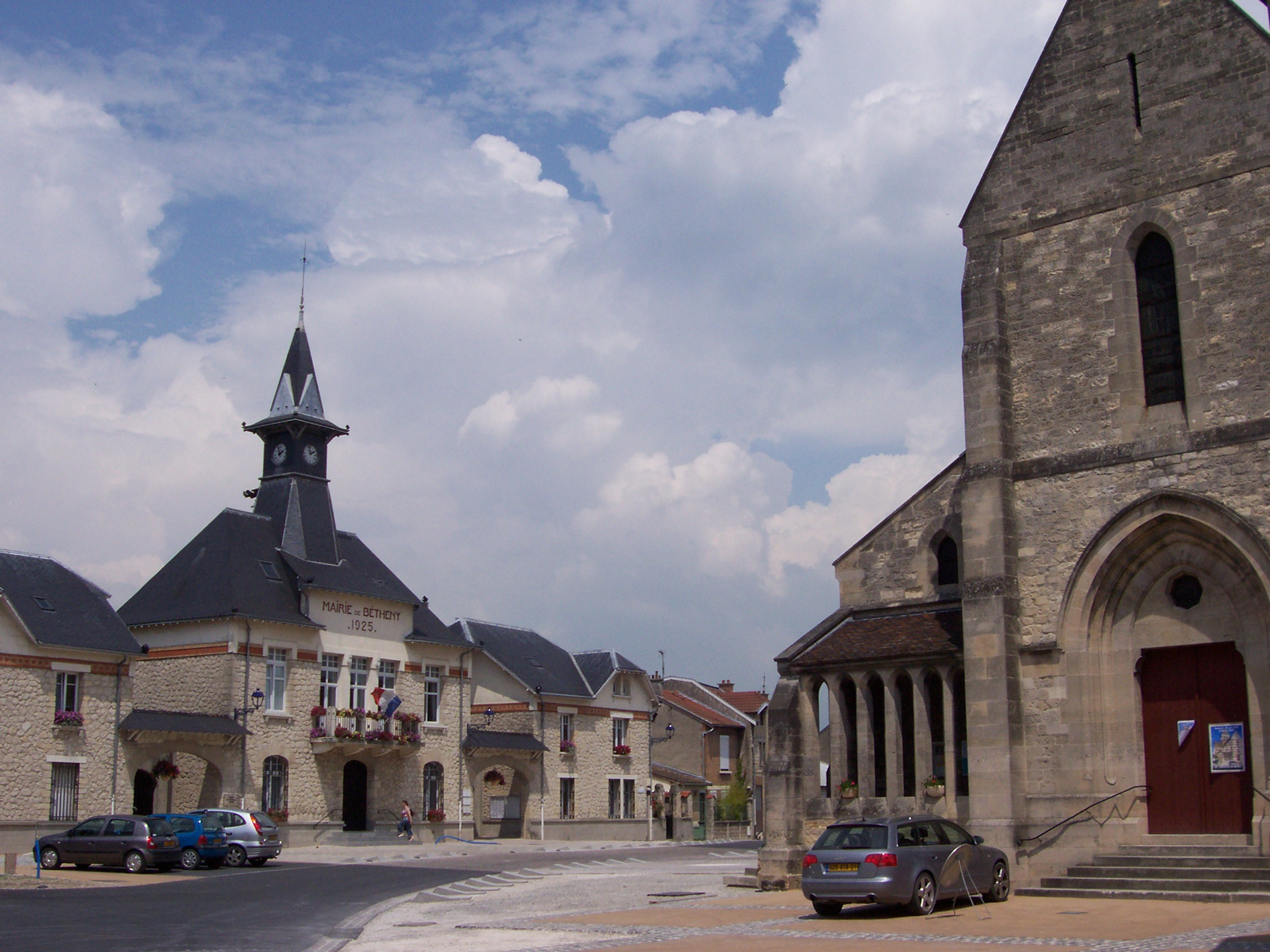
- The church and town hall in Bétheny

- Coat of arms
- Location of Bétheny
- Location within France Location within Grand Est
- Coordinates: 49°17′08″N 4°03′28″E
- Country: France
- Region: Grand Est
- Department: Marne
- Arrondissement: Reims
- Canton: Reims-5
- Intercommunality: CU Grand Reims

Government
  - Mayor (2020–2026): Alain Wanschoor
- Area^{1}: 19.9 km^{2} (7.7 sq mi)
- Elevation: 101 m (331 ft)
- Population (2023): 6,975
  - Density: 351/km^{2} (908/sq mi)
- Time zone: UTC+01:00 (CET)
  - Summer (DST): UTC+02:00 (CEST)
- INSEE/Postal code: 51055 /51450
- ^{1} French Land Register data, which excludes lakes, ponds, glaciers > 1 km^{2} (0.386 sq mi or 247 acres) and river estuaries.

Bétheny (French pronunciation: [betni]) is a commune in the Marne department in northeastern France.

== Population ==
Historical population

| Year | Pop. | ±% p.a. |
|---|---|---|
| 1793 | 287 | — |
| 1800 | 343 | +2.58% |
| 1806 | 345 | +0.10% |
| 1821 | 407 | +1.11% |
| 1831 | 480 | +1.66% |
| 1836 | 526 | +1.85% |
| 1841 | 560 | +1.26% |
| 1846 | 602 | +1.46% |
| 1851 | 582 | −0.67% |
| 1856 | 629 | +1.57% |
| 1861 | 628 | −0.03% |
| 1866 | 594 | −1.11% |
| 1872 | 586 | −0.23% |
| 1876 | 680 | +3.79% |
| 1881 | 930 | +6.46% |
| 1886 | 1,009 | +1.64% |
| 1891 | 1,108 | +1.89% |
| 1896 | 1,137 | +0.52% |
| 1901 | 1,105 | −0.57% |

| Year | Pop. | ±% p.a. |
|---|---|---|
| 1906 | 1,227 | +2.12% |
| 1911 | 1,343 | +1.82% |
| 1921 | 779 | −5.30% |
| 1926 | 1,662 | +16.36% |
| 1931 | 1,696 | +0.41% |
| 1936 | 1,643 | −0.63% |
| 1946 | 1,224 | −2.90% |
| 1954 | 1,518 | +2.73% |
| 1962 | 2,482 | +6.34% |
| 1968 | 2,747 | +1.71% |
| 1975 | 4,651 | +7.81% |
| 1982 | 5,635 | +2.78% |
| 1990 | 6,487 | +1.78% |
| 1999 | 5,943 | −0.97% |
| 2007 | 6,322 | +0.78% |
| 2012 | 6,471 | +0.47% |
| 2017 | 6,971 | +1.50% |
| 2023 | 6,975 | +0.01% |

Source: EHESS and INSEE (1968-2023)

== Personalities ==
- Marie Drouet (1885–1963) died there

== See also ==
- Communes of the Marne department
