= Eucilinus =

Scientific classification
- Domain: Eukaryota
- Kingdom: Animalia
- Phylum: Arthropoda
- Class: Insecta
- Order: Coleoptera
- Suborder: Polyphaga
- Infraorder: Cucujiformia
- Family: Curculionidae
- Tribe: Peritelini
- Genus: Eucilinus; Buchanan, 1926

Genus of beetles

Eucilinus is a genus of broad-nosed weevils in the beetle family Curculionidae. There are at least three described species in Eucilinus.

== Species ==
These three species belong to the genus Eucilinus:

- Eucilinus aridus (Van Dyke, 1938)^{i c g b}
- Eucilinus hirsutus Hatch, 1971^{i c g}
- Eucilinus mononychus Buchanan, 1926^{i c g}

Data sources: i = ITIS, c = Catalogue of Life, g = GBIF, b = Bugguide.net
