= Nematocerus =

Scientific classification
- Domain: Eukaryota
- Kingdom: Animalia
- Phylum: Arthropoda
- Class: Insecta
- Order: Coleoptera
- Suborder: Polyphaga
- Infraorder: Cucujiformia
- Family: Curculionidae
- Genus: Nematocerus; Reiche, 1850

Genus of insects

Nematocerus is a genus of beetles belonging to the family Curculionidae.

The species of this genus are found in Africa.

Species:

- Nematocerus adenensis Voss, 1962
- Nematocerus aereus Marshall, 1944
