= Marie Drouet =

French heroine of the First World War

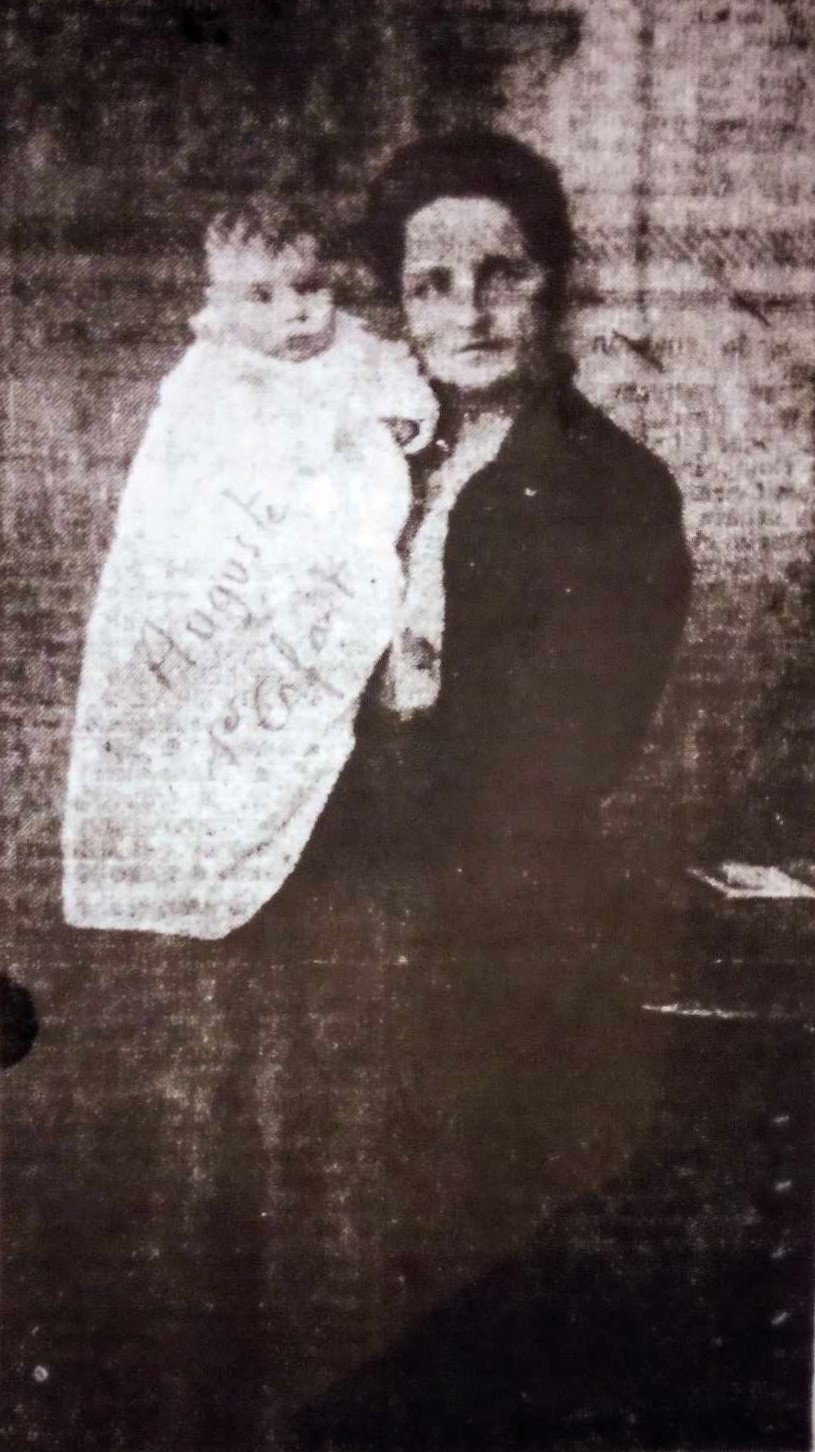
- Marie Drouet before World War I
- Born: Marie-Ernestine Juillard; 17 April 1885; Chartèves
- Died: 19 November 1963 (aged 78); Bétheny

Marie Drouet (born Marie-Ernestine Juillard, April 17, 1885 in Chartèves – November 19, 1963 in Bétheny) was a French heroine of World War I.

== Biography ==
Born April 17, 1885, in Chartèves in the department of Aisne, she is the third daughter of Auguste Juillard and Victorine Marchand.

She married Charles Drouet on January 15, 1906, in Bétheny where she lived and ran a grocery store called “Le Pot-au-rouge” on Henri-Gand street.

In 1914, Marie Drouet's husband was at the front in Verdun. Despite her family charge of four children, she saved many wounded lying on the battlefields around Reims.

She died on November 19, 1963, in Bétheny, where she had continued working as a grocer.

=== World War I civil heroine ===
Throughout the conflict, avoiding French and German encampments, she transported the wounded from the battlefield to the hospital using her plow and donkey. She also informed French artillerymen of German positions by means of slips of paper displayed at her windows.

Suspected by the French secret service of working for the enemy, the order accompanying the captain who came to arrest her at her home exonerated her. He recognized the person who picked up the wounded, the incident was closed and Marie cleared.

It was during this period that she gave birth to her fifth child.

=== Legacy ===
Marie received a medal from the city of Reims shortly after the Armistice, after which she fell into anonymity until her death in 1963. The month following her burial, an article in the newspaper L'Union recounted her exploits.

In 2014, still in the same newspaper, a second article was devoted to her on the occasion of the hundred years of the First World War. In April 2018, Val-de-Vesle dedicated a street to her. In September 2018, on the occasion of Heritage Days, the Association of Friends of Old Bétheny, organized an exhibition dedicated to her at the Bétheny museum to commemorate her rescue of many wounded. In 2018, during the commemorations of the Armistice of 11 November 1918, a tribute was paid to her in front of the monument to the dead of Bétheny.
