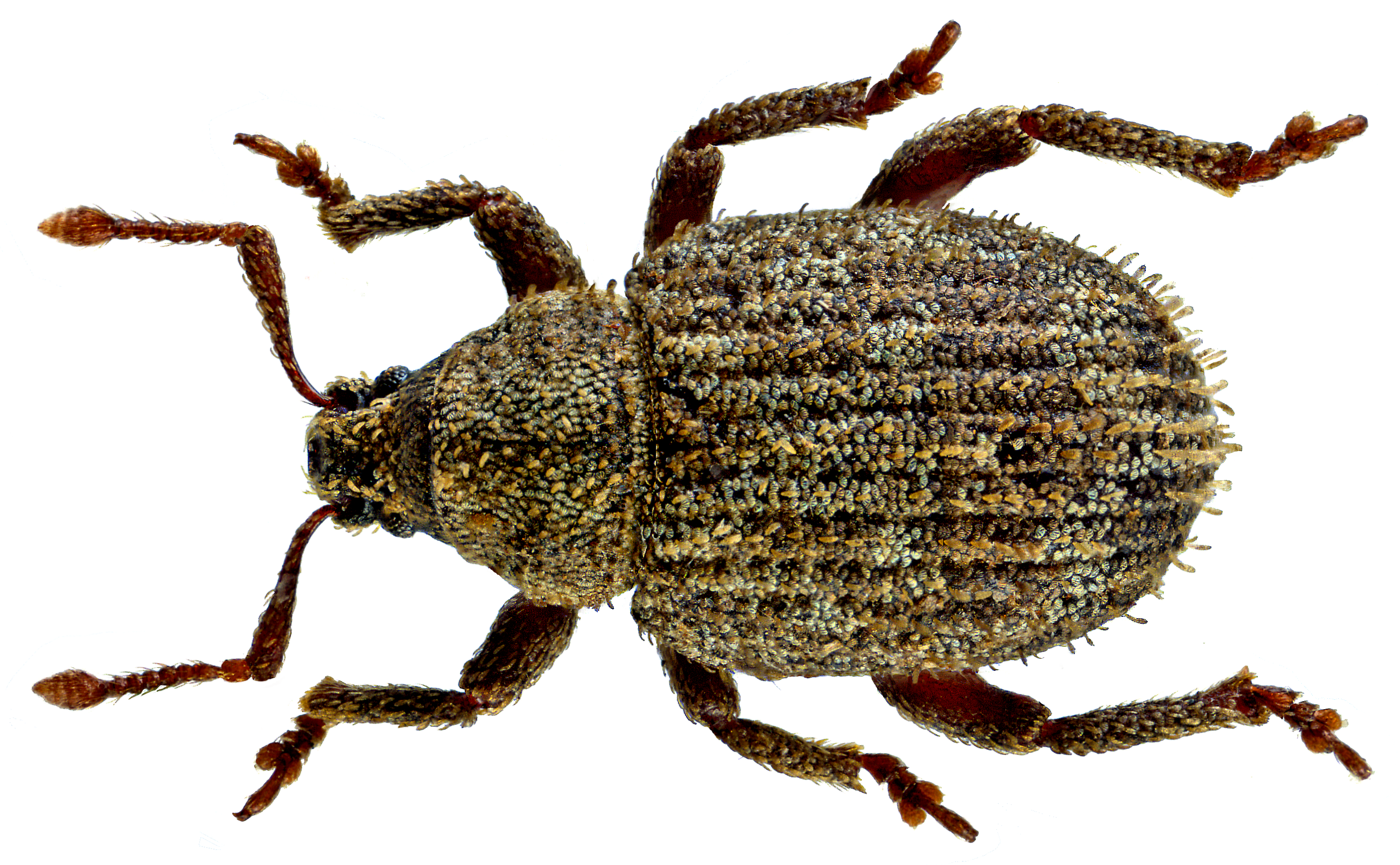
- Caenopsis waltoni

Scientific classification
- Kingdom: Animalia
- Phylum: Arthropoda
- Clade: Pancrustacea
- Class: Insecta
- Order: Coleoptera
- Suborder: Polyphaga
- Infraorder: Cucujiformia
- Superfamily: Curculionoidea
- Family: Curculionidae
- Genus: Caenopsis; Bach, 1854

= Caenopsis =

Genus of beetles

Caenopsis is a genus of beetles belonging to the family Curculionidae.

The species of this genus are found in Western Europe.

Species:

- Caenopsis andalusiensis Behne, 2008
- Caenopsis assmanni Behne, 2008
- Caenopsis bermejaensis Behne, 2008
- Caenopsis breviscapus Behne, 2008
- Caenopsis brevisetis Desbrochers, 1895
- Caenopsis crestellinensis Behne, 2008
- Caenopsis fissirostris (Walton, 1847)
- Caenopsis formaneki Leonhard, 1912
- Caenopsis gracilicornis Behne, 2008
- Caenopsis larraldi (Perris, 1858)
- Caenopsis longirostris Behne, 2008
- Caenopsis peyerimhoffi Hustache, 1935
- Caenopsis reichei Tournier, 1874
- Caenopsis stuebeni Behne, 2008
- Caenopsis waltoni (Boheman, 1843)
- Caenopsis zerchei Behne, 2008
