= Francis Elliott Drouet =

- Born: March 1, 1907; Philadelphia
- Died: December 5, 1982 (aged 75)
- Education: University of Missouri
- Scientific career
- Fields: Botany
- Workplaces: Field Museum; Academy of Natural Sciences
- Author abbrev. (botany): F.E.Drouet

Francis Elliott Drouet (1907–1982) was an American phycologist, who collected specimens in the United States, Brazil, Mexico, and Panama.

== Biography ==
Francis Drouet grew up in Independence, Missouri. After graduating from the University of Missouri with BA and MA in botany, he received there his PhD in botany in 1931. His publications from 1930 to 1936 deal with both flowering plants and blue-green algae (cyanophytes), but his later papers and books are almost exclusively on blue-green algae. He worked as a herbarium assistant at the University of Missouri until 1935. From 1935 to 1936 he was employed as a botanist in a one-year fish culture programme sponsored by the Brazilian government. From 1936 to 1939 he studied botany at Yale University on a Seessel fellowship. From 1939 to 1958 he was the curator of cryptogams at Chicago's Field Museum of Natural History.

He was also a member of the first team of biologists sent to New Mexico to determine the possible effects of atomic radiation on the biota around Los Alamos. The latter experience led to his becoming a research associate at New Mexico Highlands University in 1958 and the next year professor of botany at the University of Arizona.

At the Academy of Natural Sciences of Philadelphia, he was a research fellow and curator of the algal herbarium from 1961 until his retirement in 1975. He is known primarily for his taxonomic revisions of several families of Cyanobacteria (blue-green algae). He wrote a five-volume monograph series on the blue-green algae. His cyanophyte collection is curated in the botany department of the Smithsonian Institution.

== Selected publications ==
- Drouet, Francis (1933). "Algal Vegetation of the Large Ozark Springs". Transactions of the American Microscopical Society. 52 (2): 83–100. doi:10.2307/3222185. JSTOR 3222185.
- ——; Cohen, Aaron (1935). "The Morphology of Gonyostomum Semen from Woods Hole, Massachusetts". The Biological Bulletin. 68 (3): 422–439. doi:10.2307/1537563. JSTOR 1537563.
- —— (1937). "The Brazilian Myxophyceae. I.". American Journal of Botany. 24 (9): 598–608. doi:10.1002/j.1537-2197.1937.tb09153.x. JSTOR 2436639.
- —— (1938). "The Brazilian Myxophyceae. II". American Journal of Botany. 25 (9): 657–666. doi:10.1002/j.1537-2197.1938.tb12829.x. JSTOR 2436918.
- —— (1938). "Notes on Myxophyceae, I-IV". Bulletin of the Torrey Botanical Club. 65 (5): 285–292. doi:10.2307/2481233. JSTOR 2481233.
- —— (1938). "The Oscillatoriaceae of Southern Massachusetts". Rhodora. 40 (474): 221–241. JSTOR 23301934.
- —— (1938). "Myxophyceae of the Yale North India Expedition Collected by G. E. Hutchinson". Transactions of the American Microscopical Society. 57 (2): 127–131. doi:10.2307/3222740. JSTOR 3222740.
- ——; Daily, William A. (1952). "A Synopsis of the Coccoid Myxophyceae". Butler University Botanical Studies. 10 (11/23): 220–223. JSTOR 41822501.
- ——; Daily, William A. (1957). "Revision of the Coccoid Myxophyceae: Additions and Corrections". Transactions of the American Microscopical Society. 76 (2): 219–222. doi:10.2307/3223637. JSTOR 3223637.
- —— (1962). "Gomont's Ecophenes of the Blue-Green Alga, Microcoleus vaginatus (Oscillatoriaceae)". Proceedings of the Academy of Natural Sciences of Philadelphia. 114: 191–205. JSTOR 4064573.
- —— (1963). "Ecophenes of Schizothrix calcicola (Oscillatoriaceae)". Proceedings of the Academy of Natural Sciences of Philadelphia. 115: 261–281. JSTOR 4064562.
