= Aristide Drouet =

French cyclist

Personal information
- Born: 9 June 1903
- Died: 4 May 1949 (aged 45)

Cycling career
- Sport: Cycling
- Discipline: Road
- Role: Rider

Aristide Drouet (9 June 1903 – 5 April 1949) was a French racing cyclist. He rode in the 1929 Tour de France.
