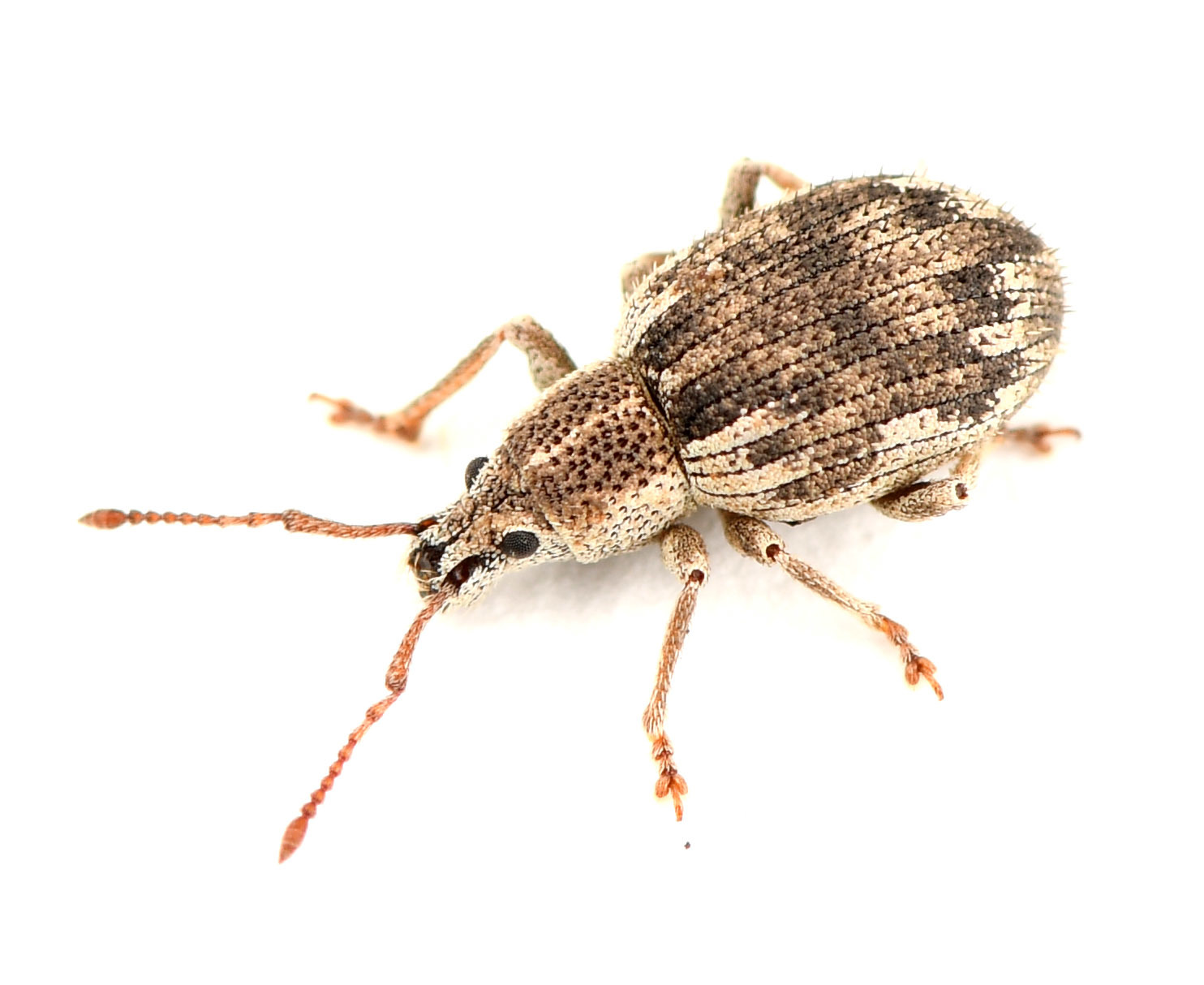
- Peritelinus oregonus, Oregon

Scientific classification
- Kingdom: Animalia
- Phylum: Arthropoda
- Class: Insecta
- Order: Coleoptera
- Suborder: Polyphaga
- Infraorder: Cucujiformia
- Family: Curculionidae
- Genus: Peritelinus; Casey, 1888

= Peritelinus =

Genus of beetles

Peritelinus is a genus of broad-nosed weevils in the beetle family Curculionidae. There are at least two described species in Peritelinus.

== Species ==
These two species belong to the genus Peritelinus:

- Peritelinus erinaceus Van Dyke, 1936
- Peritelinus oregonus Van Dyke, 1936
