= Robert-Badinter School Complex =

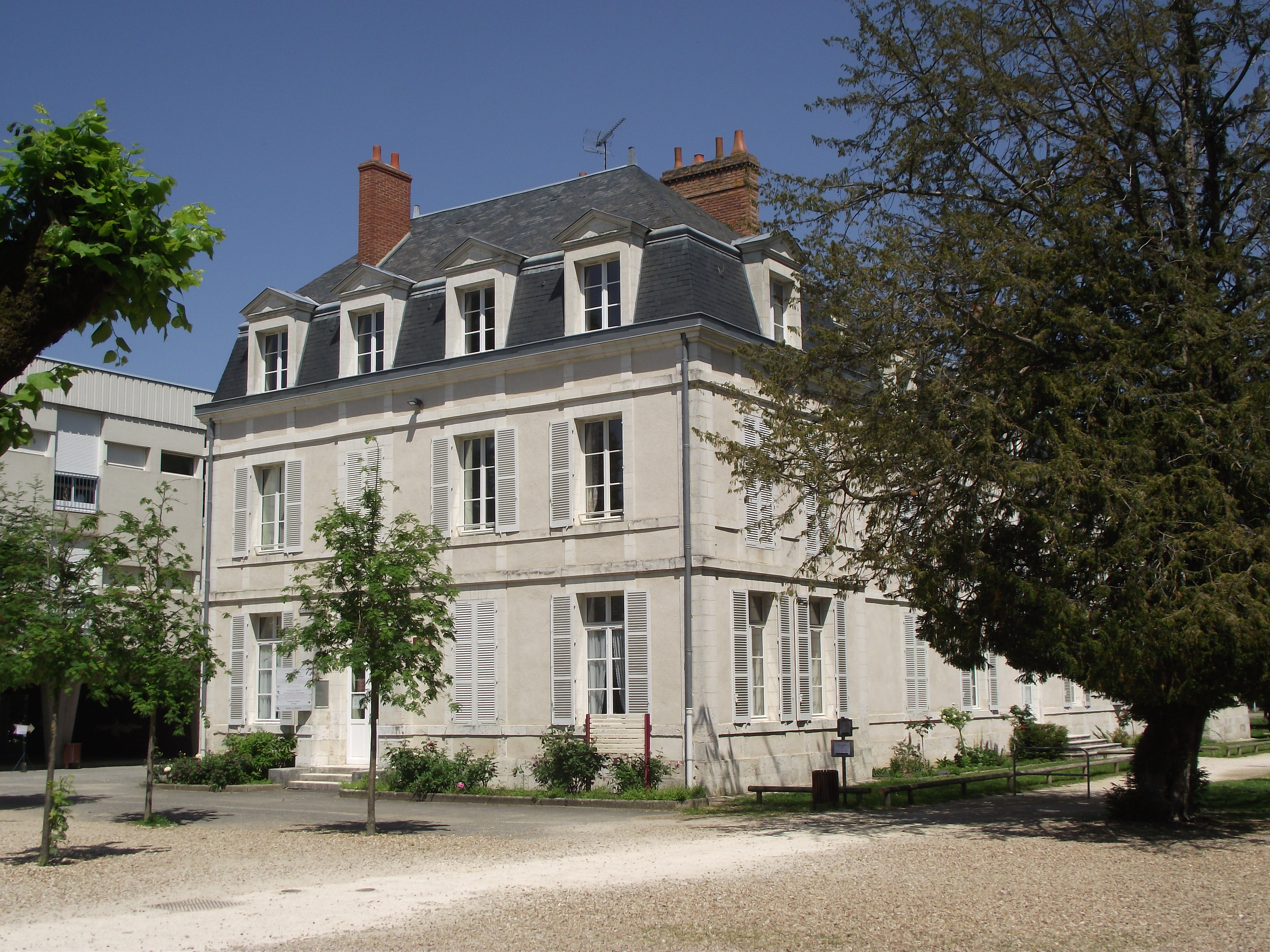
- The Lunier building, in May 2012.

Location
- Blois, France; 47°35′51″N 1°19′48″E

Information
- Type: Local Public Educational Institution (EPLE)
- Founded: 1587 (royal college); 1804 / 1808 (modern college); 1946 (general secondary school); 1963 (contemporary college); 1964 (vocational secondary school); 2025 (international secondary school)
- Educational authority: Centre-Val de Loire (high school); Loir-et-Cher (middle school)
- Principal: Karine Harribey
- Principal (High School): Jérôme Lauxire
- Vice Principal: Rémi Artige (General High School); Christelle Moulin (Vocational Section); Jérôme Le Guéré (Director of Vocational Training, D.D.F.P.T.)
- Grades: General Baccalauréat, STI2D (Science and Technology of Industry and Sustainable Development) Baccalauréat, Vocational Baccalauréats: MEI (Industrial Equipment Maintenance), ELEEC (Electrical Engineering), TCI (Sheet Metal Fabrication), TU (Machining Techniques), BTS (Advanced Technician Certificate) |

The Robert-Badinter school complex, which includes the Robert-Badinter International High School and the Augustin-Thierry Middle School, is a public secondary and higher education institution located in Blois, within the Orléans-Tours academy. Bringing together a middle school, an international (general and technological) high school, a vocational section, and the Greta Centre-Val de Loire departmental agency, the school complex welcomed 1,863 students and pupils (including 163 boarders) and 287 staff members (including 180 teachers) at the start of the 2024 school year.

As the heir to the Royal College founded by Henry III in 1587, the Robert-Badinter school complex was established on its current site, a vast 14-hectare (35-acre), shortly after World War II. Today, it offers a broad range of educational programs (international, binational, and European sections, film and audiovisual studies, engineering sciences, creative technological innovation, etc.). It prepares students for the National Diploma (DNB), the general and technological baccalaureates (STI2D), the Spanish bachillerato, the vocational baccalaureate (MEI, MEEC, TCI, and TU), and BTS qualifications (industrial maintenance, design and implementation of automated systems, technical sales, and technical solutions consulting and sales).

== Location ==
The Robert-Badinter school complex is located at 13 Avenue de Châteaudun, in the northern part of the Bourg-Neuf district, in the Provinces sector, in Blois.

Covering 14 hectares (35 acres), it is divided into two parcels of land, situated on either side of Honoré-de-Balzac Street. The larger parcel (accessible from both Avenue de Châteaudun and Honoré-de-Balzac Street) houses the majority of the school buildings, as well as administrative offices and student services (cafeteria and student common room). The second, smaller parcel, accessible only via Honoré-de-Balzac Street, contains the Vinci workshops, the new gymnasium, and sports fields. An underground passage beneath Honoré-de-Balzac Street allows users to move between the two areas without exiting the premises.

The school complex consists of around twenty buildings, distributed across both parcels in a layout designed for functional organization. Buildings used by all students occupy a central position. The older buildings are clearly distinct in architecture and materials from those built starting in the 1960s.

== History ==
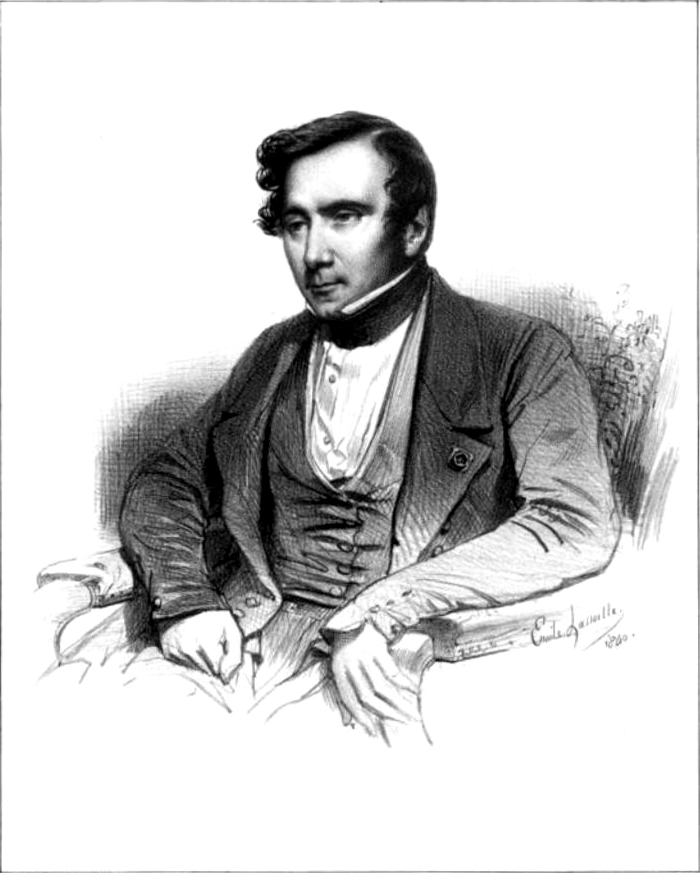
The Blésois historian Augustin Thierry, represented by Émile Lassalle in 1840.

In 1560, a royal ordinance issued by Charles IX following the Estates General of Orléans required all chapters of canons in the kingdom to provide the income from a prebend to support a tutor tasked with educating the town’s young people free of charge. However, in Blois, the implementation of this ordinance was long delayed because the canons of Saint-Sauveur saw it merely as a substantial loss of revenue.

As the Orléans ordinance appeared poised for implementation, a conflict arose between the two candidates for the tutor position at the future Blois college. After the appointment of Jean Housset, a former regent (i.e., professor) at the University of Paris, his rival, Laurent Le Tellier, took the matter to the Parlement of Paris, which ultimately ruled in his favor. However, appointed as “master and professor of the great schools of Blois” in 1569, Le Tellier died shortly afterward, with no successor secured.

The history of the Robert-Badinter school complex begins with the creation of a Royal College in Blois by royal charter from Henry III in 1581. Opened on April 1, 1587, the first establishment was initially housed in a house in the Bourg-Neuf district, located outside the city walls.

The Blois college was ultimately established by letters patent from King Henry III dated December 10, 1581. Taking advantage of the presence of the king and the court, the people of Blois expressed their desire for a school capable of educating their youth. This is at least suggested by the content of the royal document:

Our beloved aldermen, residents, and inhabitants of our town of Blois have made representations to us in our council, stating that the instruction of youth in good letters, morals, and the Catholic religion, both of the said town and its suburbs as well as the surrounding regions of Beauce and Sologne, to keep them from idleness and debauchery—many of said inhabitants lacking the means to send them to the schools of Paris due to the expenses and costs involved—the said petitioners particularly desire that in our said town of Blois there be a college composed of regents and learned persons; and considering that due to the ruins and great losses the said inhabitants have suffered from past troubles, especially since the said town is filled and populated mostly with our domestic officers [...].

— Jean-Yves Denis, Le Collège - Le Lycée Augustin-Thierry : grande et petite histoire, p. 11.

To ensure the financial independence of the future college and enable it to acquire suitable premises, the king provided it with regular income. The college’s finances were thus based on an octroi levied on goods passing over and under the town bridge, as well as a tax of six sols per minot of salt sold at the Blois salt granary and the Mer chamber.

Opened on April 1, 1587, in a residence in Bourg-Neuf called the “Saint-Christophe house,” the royal college of Blois received a monopoly on secondary education in the town, with only small reading schools permitted alongside it. The institution was governed by a strict internal regulation largely modeled on the statutes of the colleges of the University of Paris. Students were required to speak only in Latin, and boarders could not leave the school without the principal’s permission. All students had to attend Mass daily, and boarders were obliged to confess at every major feast and to fast, if able, on vigil days. During dinner, the most advanced students took turns reading from the Old Testament and the New Testament. Indeed, the principal’s primary role was to steer students away from bad influences and educate them in the fear of God.

The institution consisted of five classes supervised by regents (four laymen and one priest) with unequal incomes: the regent of the first class received 200 livres in wages, the second 150 livres, the third 60 livres, the fourth 50 livres, and the last, who also officiated Mass, was paid 100 livres. In addition to their salaries, regents received half an écu per year from students, which they used to supply candles for classroom lighting. Poor students were exempt from this fee, but regents could forgo the allowance to the principal, who then handled classroom lighting.

Beyond his supervisory duties, the principal also taught Ancient Greek at the institution. For his work, he received 600 livres in wages, plus income from the prebends of the Saint-Laumer Abbey. He also received a sum ranging from 80 to 100 livres, depending on wheat prices, for each boarder’s food. However, the budget for maintaining the college buildings was deducted from his salary.

However, the royal college was born in a tumultuous context. Since 1562, France had been shaken by the Wars of Religion pitting Catholics against Protestants. The Loire Valley, periodically hosting the Court in its châteaux, was a theater of violence, with examples including the sack of Blois by Huguenots in 1568 and the assassination of Duke of Guise, leader of the Leaguers, on the orders of King Henry III in 1588.

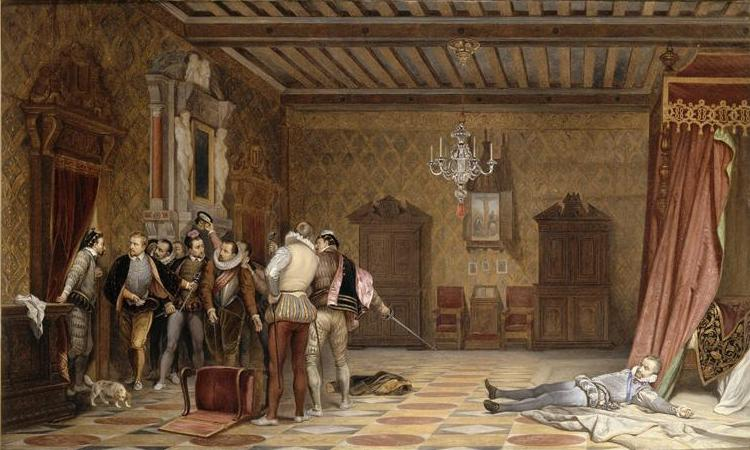
The assassination of the Duke of Guise at the Château de Blois is one of the key moments of the Wars of Religion in France. Painting by Paul Delaroche, 1834.

Located in the Bourg-Neuf district, outside the city walls, the college was in an area harder to protect. Many parents feared that enrolling their children there would make them easy targets for militias of either side. Under these conditions, Blois residents preferred sending their children to study in Paris, and the college struggled to attract students. After a few years, the institution faltered and was closed multiple times, despite municipal efforts to sustain it.

The college was then relocated in 1601 to Bretonnerie Street, on the site of what is now the central post office. However, the college soon faced severe internal conflicts. Its first principal, Jean Housset, resigned in 1605 but immediately began diverting boarders to his home as private students. Moreover, the new college authorities, Jacques Vallet (1605–1609) and then Jean Dufour (1609–1622), were challenged by regents who openly undermined their authority despite increased wages. In this environment, students started playing cards, speaking French instead of Latin, swearing, and freely entering or leaving the institution.

Managed by secular clergy until 1622, the Royal College was then entrusted to the Society of Jesus (Jesuits), who lost control when they were expelled from France in 1764.

In response to the dissatisfaction of Blois residents, King Louis XIII finally granted the municipal authorities’ request by entrusting the college to the Jesuits on November 16, 1622:

Today, the 16th of November sixteen hundred and twenty-two, the King being at Tarascon, wishing to gratify and favorably treat the Magistrates, Aldermen, Officers, Merchants, Bourgeois, and inhabitants of his town of Blois, and acceding to the very humble supplication they made to him. His Majesty has granted them that the College of the said town, with its revenues, appurtenances, and dependencies, be and remain henceforth inseparably united to the Society of the Jesuit Fathers of his kingdom, with the charge to perpetually perform the functions of their order and profession there, and especially for the instruction of the children of the said town in good morals, with such number of classes, lecturers, and professors in service as will be agreed upon between them, His said Majesty permitting the said Jesuit Fathers to accept and possess the legacies and donations that may be made to them for the increase of the revenue of the said College up to the sum of six thousand livres in rents [...].

— Jean-Yves Denis, Le Collège - Le Lycée Augustin-Thierry : grande et petite histoire, p. 14.

With the expansion of its premises (under the successive direction of Father Étienne Martellange and Brother Charles Turmel) and an increase in faculty, the college faced significant financial difficulties. King Louis XIII further reduced its income by exempting Blois residents from all salt duties. However, he compensated for this loss by granting the institution an annual rent of 1,000 livres (1634), then 1,200 livres (1641).

These economic challenges did not deter the Jesuits from erecting a Baroque-style chapel. To this end, they acquired a plot adjacent to the school in 1623 thanks to a donation from bailiff Henri Hurault de Cheverny (son of Chancellor Philippe Hurault de Cheverny). Named Saint-Louis-des-Jésuites Church, the chapel was completed in 1671 with financial support from various figures, including the king and his brother, Gaston d’Orléans. In gratitude, the Jesuits later housed a funerary monument containing the duke’s heart in their chapel.

Under the Jesuits, the college quickly gained a significant reputation, and several of its professors remain well-known today. Among them, Principal Jean de Brisacier (1603–1668), appointed in 1651, was a fierce opponent of Jansenism (represented in the Blois region by Abbot Jean Callaghan of Cour-Cheverny). He later became a visitor apostolic to the province of Portugal. Rhetoric professor Jean-Baptiste Gresset (1709–1777), author of the poem Vert-Vert in 1734, joined the French Academy in 1748.

Other figures associated with the college gained fame for their roles in the conquest, administration, and evangelization of New France. This includes René-Robert Cavelier de La Salle (1643–1687), the renowned discoverer of Louisiana, who taught at the Blois and Tours colleges from 1664 to 1666. Likewise, Father Jérôme Lalemant (1593–1673), a missionary among the Hurons, served as rector of the Blois college from 1632 to 1636. Similarly, Charles Raymbault (1602–1642) and Jacques-Quintin de la Bretonnière (1689–1754) taught at Blois before joining the New France mission to convert Amerindians to Catholicism.

Several students also achieved prominence in various fields. Ange-François Fariau de Saint-Ange (1747–1810) became known as a poet, translator, and academician. Claude Dupin (1686–1769) left his mark as a financier and tax farmer. Finally, Jean-Baptiste de Vimeur de Rochambeau (1725–1807), who spent six months at the college before returning to study in Vendôme, gained fame leading the French squadron in the American Revolutionary War.

In the 17th and 18th centuries, the Catholic Church in France was divided between Ultramontane and Gallican factions. Loyal supporters of the Pope and opponents of Jansenism, the Jesuits incurred the wrath of those defending the autonomy of the French clergy. In 1762, the Parlement of Paris expelled the Society of Jesus from France, citing that it “harms civil order, violates natural law, destroys religion and morality, [and] corrupts youth.” King Louis XV attempted to delay the decision but ultimately yielded. In November 1764, a royal edict banned the Jesuits from the country, and the schools they managed were stripped from them.

After the Jesuits’ departure, municipal authorities attempted to entrust the college to the Benedictines of the Saint-Laumer Abbey, already renowned for their teaching at the Pontlevoy college. However, the monks declined, arguing that the Parlement of Paris’s decision to expel Ignatius of Loyola’s followers reflected a push to secularize their schools. The aldermen then turned to the Dominicans, with no greater success. After several failures, they resigned themselves to placing the royal college under secular control.

To ensure the college’s smooth operation, King Louis XV issued a new internal regulation, signed at the Versailles on December 8, 1763. It largely mirrored the 1587 text, though the principal’s salary was increased to 1,000 livres annually, and the regents’ wages were also adjusted (the lowest-paid, for 6th grade, received 600 livres per year). A new provision granted teachers a 300-livre pension after 20 years of service.

In 1768, the college welcomed Father Jean Boutault as its new principal, a brave but ineffective man who led it for 23 years. Alongside him, less competent and hard-to-recruit regents taught, by 1789, Latin, history, geography, and mythology (core subjects) and mathematics (optional). Philosophy and science had vanished from the curriculum. Under these tough conditions, the college declined rapidly: while it had 120 students when the Jesuits left, only 26 remained in 1768.

On April 8, 1791, the teaching staff was dismissed for refusing to swear allegiance to the Civil Constitution of the Clergy, now mandatory for all public officials. Replacement instructors were appointed, but the college was plagued by resignations, expulsions, and absenteeism. Few candidates applied for teaching positions, and those who did often stayed only briefly, hampered by low, irregularly paid salaries—sometimes delayed by up to three months. In the politically charged atmosphere of the time, teaching became a precarious occupation. Despite these challenges, a final prize ceremony was held in 1792, with the recipients’ names recorded in the city’s registers.

In 1793, during the Reign of Terror, the declaration that the "Fatherland was in danger" sealed the college’s fate. It was closed, and its premises were requisitioned by the Republic to house a workshop producing saltpeter and munitions. The Saint-Louis-des-Jésuites Chapel was converted into a hay storage facility. More dramatically, the former principal, Jean Boutault, was arrested by revolutionary authorities and faced the Revolutionary Tribunal. He narrowly escaped the guillotine thanks to the support of Blois residents and the fall of Robespierre.

Closed in 1793 by the revolutionaries, the college was re-established only in 1804 as a municipal secondary school, which was promoted to the rank of municipal college in 1808. By then located in the former Bourg-Moyen Abbey, the institution served much of the Blois bourgeoisie. It was renamed on September 30, 1872, to honor one of its most famous students, the Blois-born historian Augustin Thierry (1795–1856). This renaming marked a turning point, elevating the institution’s prestige and tying it to a figure of national significance. Destroyed in a fire caused by German bombings at the beginning of World War II (June 1940), the college operated in temporary locations for several years under the occupying forces.

Eventually relocated in 1945–1946 to premises formerly used by the Loir-et-Cher departmental asylum, the institution was elevated to the rank of high school at the same time. It grew rapidly. Becoming a school complex with the creation of a general education middle school (1963) and a technical section (1964), Augustin-Thierry played a key role in Blois’s international outreach, establishing exchange partnerships with the Grammar School of Lewes in the UK (1946) and the Hochrhein Gymnasium of Waldshut in Germany (1958).

Open to female students since 1963, the institution transformed with the democratization of education in France in the 1960s–1970s. It reached its peak at the end of the 1980s, hosting nearly 2,500 students and pupils. The complex also fostered international ties, notably through twinning programs with Lewes in the UK and Waldshut in Germany, enhancing its cultural and educational outreach.

The Augustin-Thierry School Complex faced several controversies in the early 21st century. In 2011, the rector of the Orléans-Tours Academy, Marie Reynier, sparked outrage with comments linking academic failure to immigrant children, deemed discriminatory and racist. The case drew significant attention but was ultimately dismissed by the Orléans prosecutor in 2012 for “insufficiently characterized offense.”

In 2012–2013, a conflict between Principal Éric Gommé and Marie-Anne Clément, a CGT delegate teacher, escalated tensions, leading to Gommé’s departure and transfer to Lycée Choiseul in Tours.

In November 2009, a fifth-grade student jumped from the third floor of the Descartes building during class.

In March 2022, a general lycée student, Aya Houari, was selected as a protégé of the Fondation Un Avenir Ensemble, linked to the Legion of Honour’s Grand Chancellery, during a ceremony attended by Principal Jérôme Lauxire and Deputy Régis Ventribout. In May 2022, another student, Mathis Ridel, received similar recognition.

Increasingly focused on internationalization, the lycée introduced a British BFI section in 2023, offering a trilingual French-English-German track.

Like many French schools, the complex faced a hoax bomb threat on March 28, 2024, prompting police intervention. On November 29, 2024, amid a national debate on “affective, relational, and sexual education,” the college hosted Ministers Anne Genetet and Geneviève Darrieussecq for a HPV vaccination session.

In January 2025, the high school was elevated to the status of an international high school and was renamed Robert-Badinter High School, while the middle school retained the name Augustin-Thierry.

== Architecture and park ==
=== Listed buildings ===
Rich in ancient history, the site of the Robert-Badinter school complex housed a leprosarium (the Saint-Lazare leper hospital) at the beginning of the 12th century, before becoming a priory of the Canons of Saint Genevieve until the French Revolution. Sold as national property in 1791, the estate and buildings of the religious institution were acquired by Nicolas Chambon de Monteaux, then mayor of Paris. After being sold several times (notably to General Hugo), they were finally purchased in 1834 by a banker named Jean-Simon Chambert-Péan. The latter had a large villa built there, the "Château Saint-Lazare" (now the Hugo building), incorporating remnants of the old priory, such as the rib vaulted hall that is now the chapter room.

Acquired in 1861 by the Loir-et-Cher department, Chambert-Péan’s residence was integrated into the departmental asylum of Loir-et-Cher, then managed by Doctor Jules Lunier (1822–1884). Shortly after, the size of the Saint-Lazare villa was doubled with the addition of the Lunier villa (now the Lunier building), which today houses the administration of the school complex. Various annex buildings were later built in the park, including the Tilleuls Pavilion (currently known by the same name). Decommissioned during World War II, these buildings began housing the Augustin-Thierry High School following the Liberation.

In the early 1990s, the Rectorate planned to demolish the remains of the former priory and the Lunier hospice to replace them with more modern buildings. However, this project was met with opposition from part of the teaching staff and local heritage advocates, who founded an “Association for the Preservation of the Old Buildings and Park of the Augustin-Thierry High School.” Ultimately, the historical elements were listed in the General Inventory in 1992, and a study was carried out by art historian Annie Cosperec.

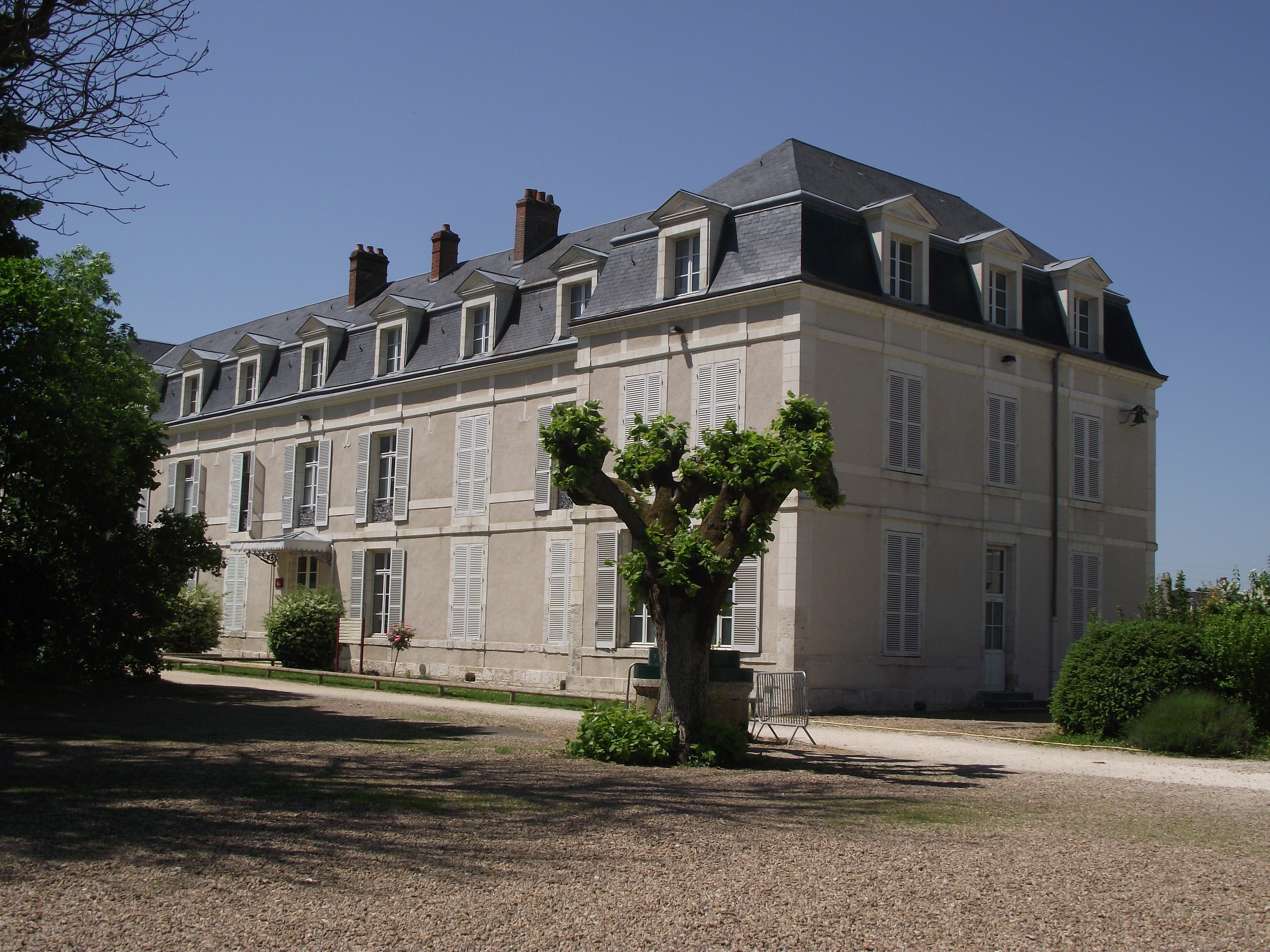
The Hugo Building, formerly the Villa Saint-Lazare.

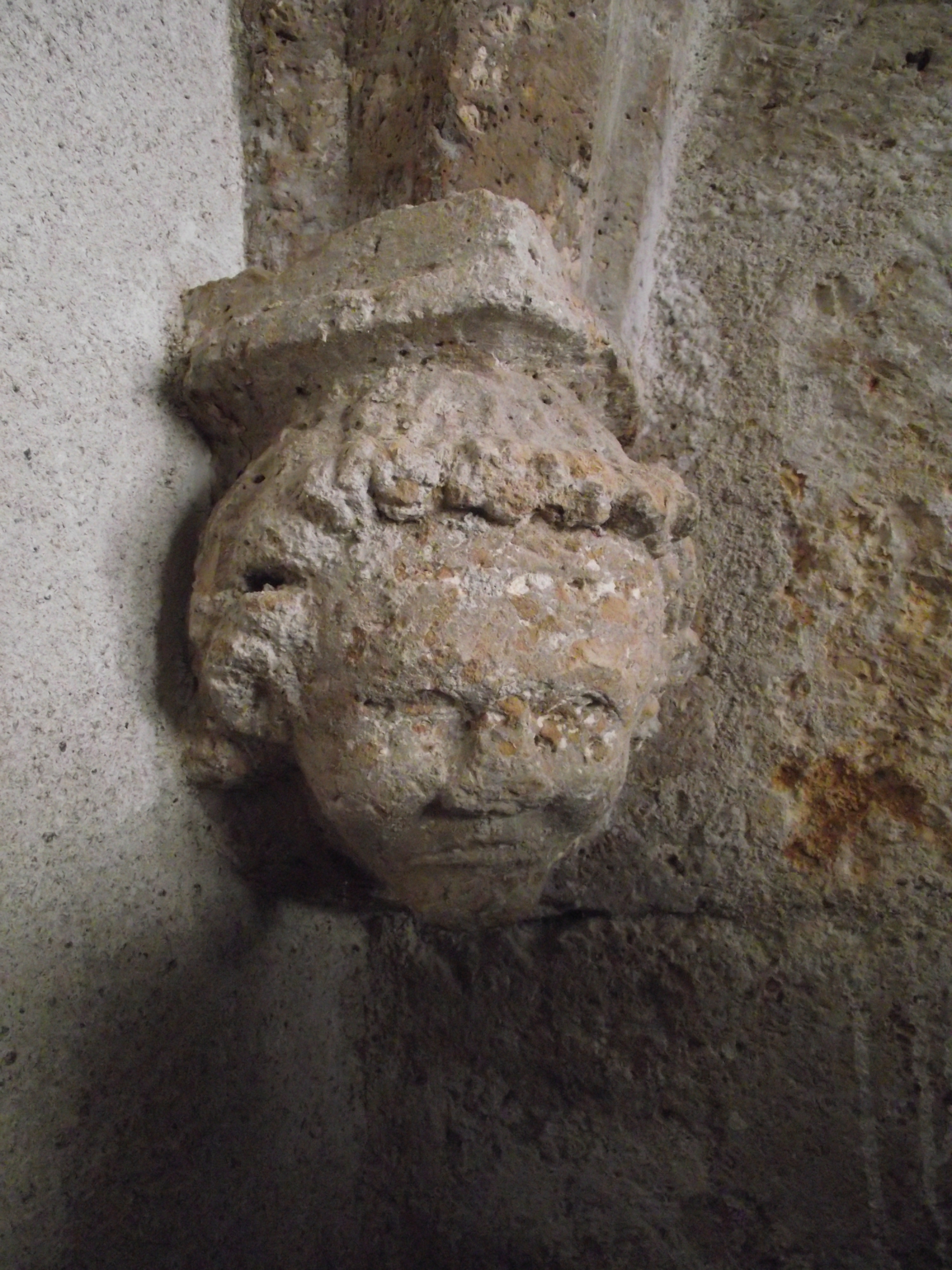
Cul-de-lampe of the chapter house in the Hugo Building.

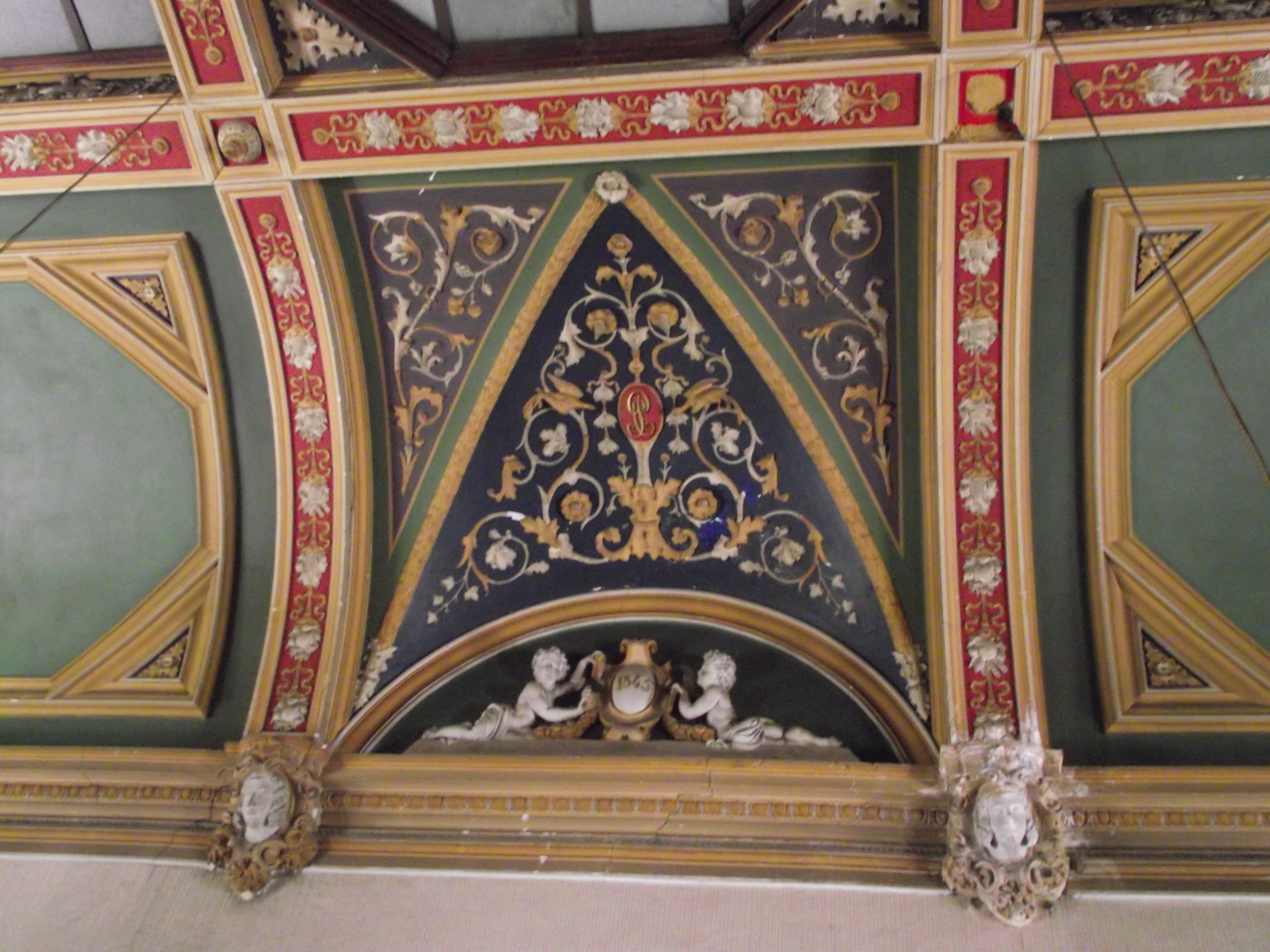
Detail of the ceiling of the Chambert-Péan room in the Hugo Building.

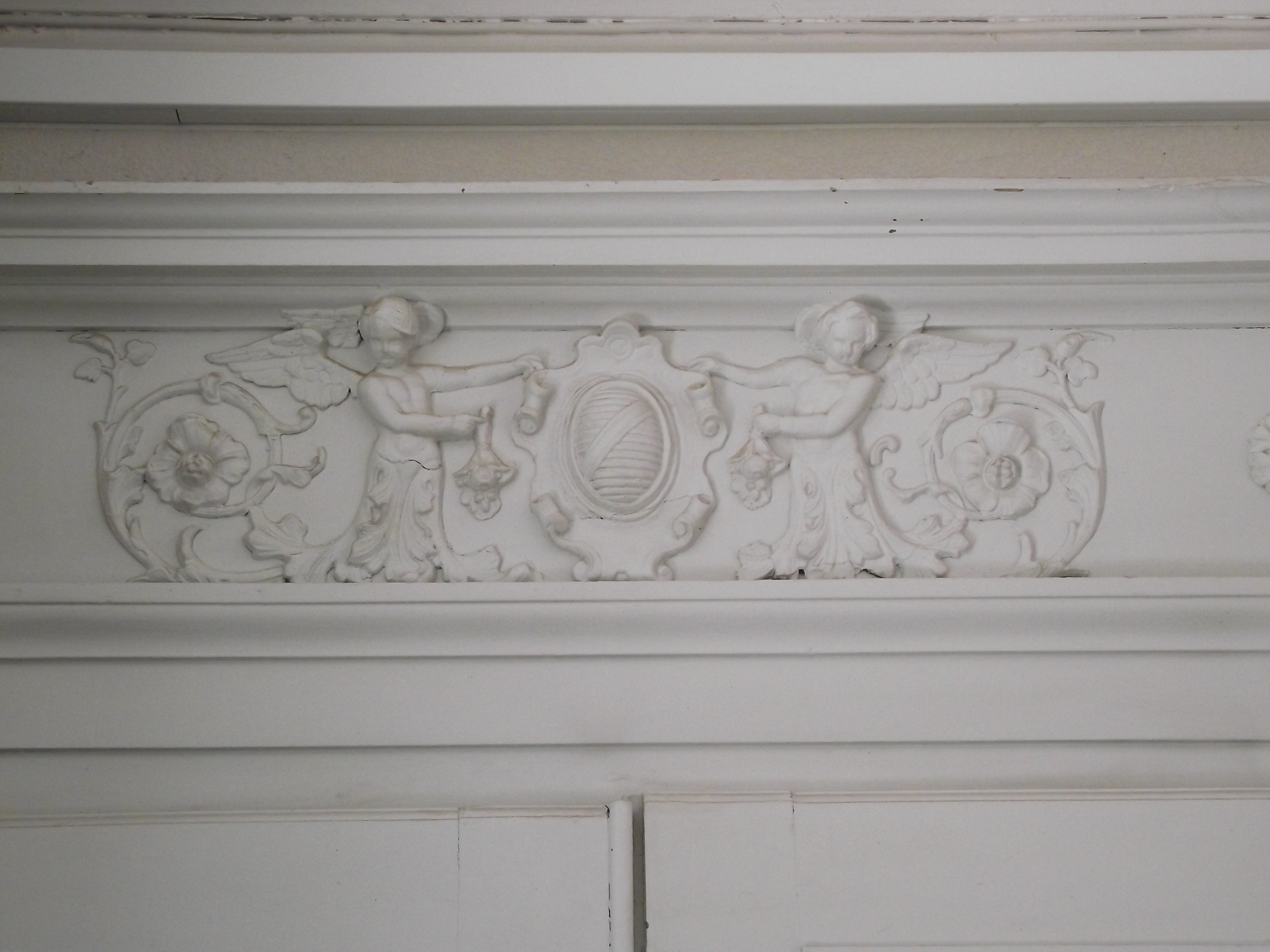
Mouldings inside the Hugo Building.

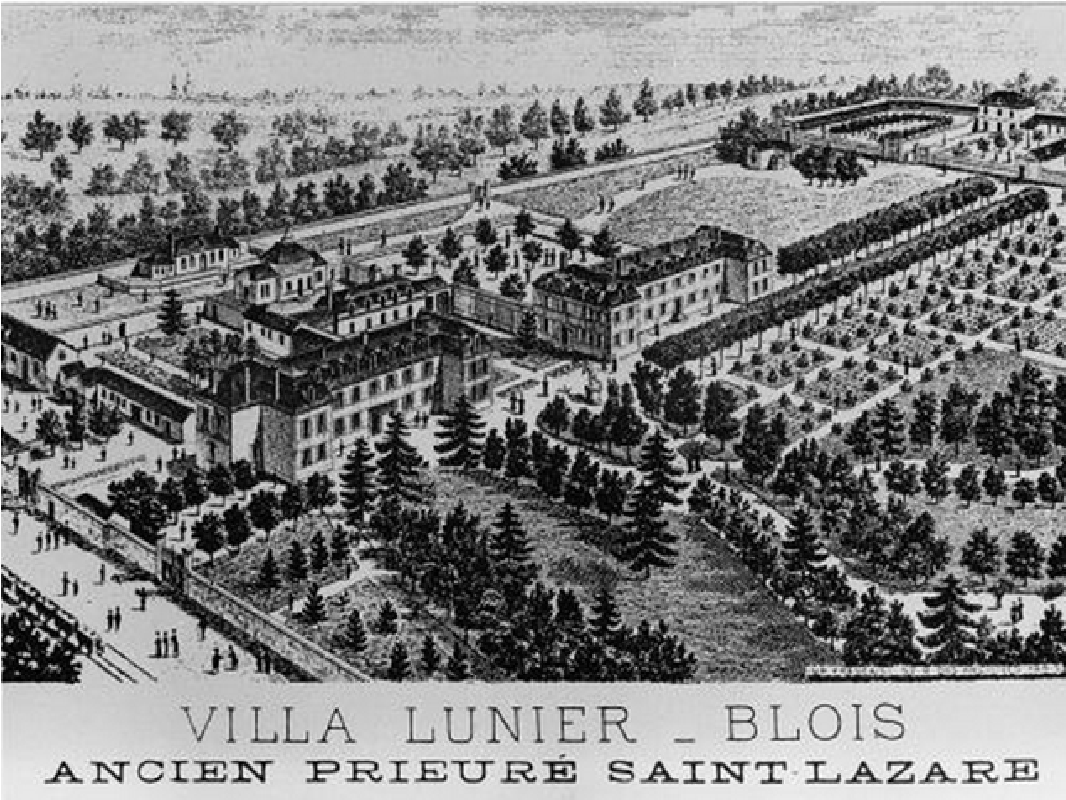
Engraving of the Villa Lunier, c. 1900.

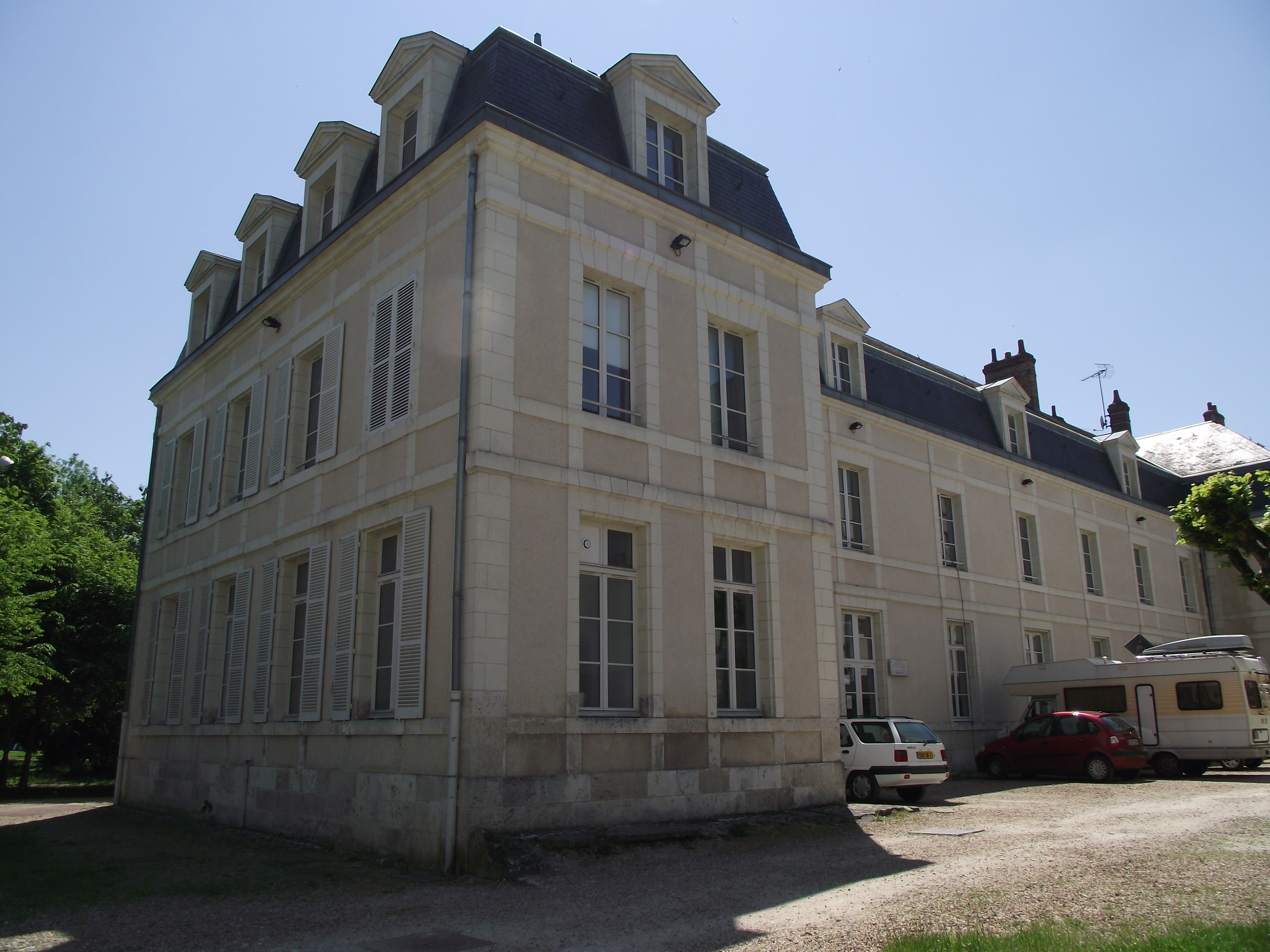
The Lunier Building, formerly the Lunier Hospice.

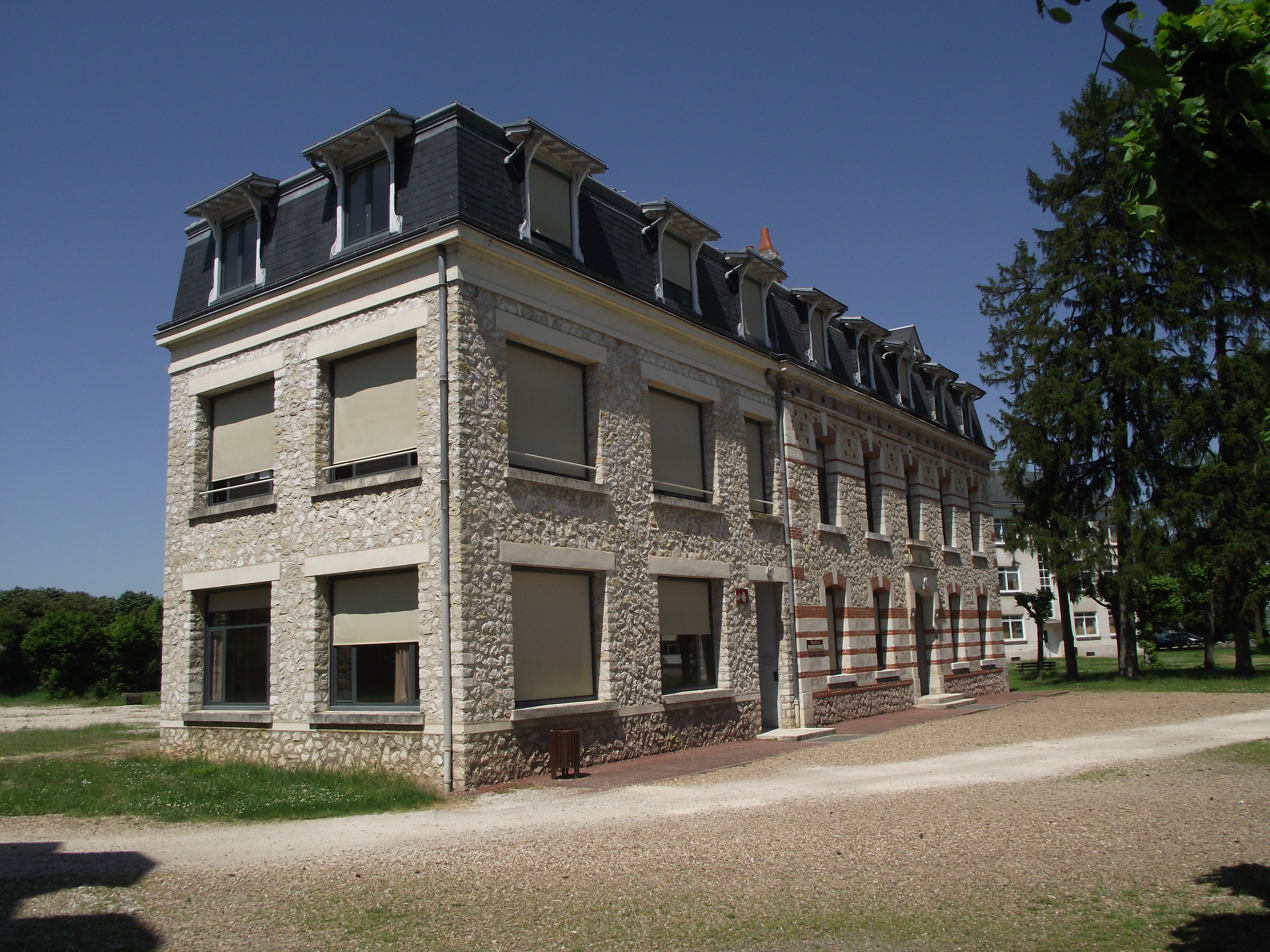
The former “Les Tilleuls” pavilion, extended in 1947.

=== Other buildings ===
Map of the school complex (2023). A: Villa Les Acacias B: Balzac Building (I) C: Curie Building (E) D: Descartes Building (D) G1 and G2: Gymnasium H: Hugo Building J: Josephine-Baker Building L: Lavoisier Building (W) Lu: Lunier Building M: Michelet Building (N) MdL: Glaïeuls Building and Jean-Germanaud Student Center P: Papin Building (M) R: School Restaurant (I) T: Tilleuls Building V: Vinci Workshops (A)

In 1946–1947, the former Lunier hospice was converted into a school. The Tilleuls Pavilion was expanded to accommodate the premises of the winter agricultural school. A new building was also added to the old ones: Building O, now known as the Lavoisier Building. Designed by architect Henri Jannin, this structure is an east-west-oriented block with two stories and a raised basement. Built with dressed stone on the main façade and masonry coated with plaster on the rear, the Lavoisier Building features a double-pitched hip roof covered with slate. It now houses general and science education for the professional section (SEP).

Between 1960 and 1963, Building N (now the Michelet Building) was added to the original ensemble, based on plans by architect André Aubert (1905–1987). Oriented north-south, this building has concrete foundations and a reinforced concrete frame and floors. Initially intended to house the dormitory, the Michelet Building also contained, in the former common room, two carved wooden bas-reliefs measuring approximately 1.5 m by 5.5 m each. Created in 1963 by artist Jean Touret as part of the “1% for art” initiative, this large carved decoration depicting horsemen is now displayed inside the Balzac Building.

Between 1963 and 1966, new buildings designed by André Aubert and Pierre Large were added. These included the workshop facilities of Building A (at the current site of the Vinci workshops), Building M (now the Papin Building), which housed a second dormitory, Building I (now the Balzac Building) which became the new dining hall, and Building G which contains the central heating plant.

Between 1968 and 1973, a fourth construction phase was carried out by André Aubert and Pierre Large. Two parallelepiped-shaped buildings for general education (Building D, now Descartes) and science education (Building E, now Curie) were added to the complex. In addition, Building K, which housed a gymnasium and swimming pool, was inaugurated. In 1975–1976, a new dormitory—initially called Building J and later named Joséphine-Baker—was built behind the old Lunier hospice, which led to the demolition of part of the older structures. Very different from the previous buildings, this one is square-shaped and features a central patio. It also has only two floors.

In 1999, Building I (now Balzac) was expanded to accommodate administrative offices, meeting rooms, and a second gymnasium. In 2001, a student center (“maison des lycéens” or MDL) was added near the dining hall. Covering 400 m², this MDL was named “Jean-Germanaud Student Center” in 2005, in honor of a former Spanish teacher at the school.

In 2008, the technical section workshops (Vinci Building) underwent major renovations and were significantly expanded, to house a large technical training platform of 7,000 m². Artist Nicolas Royer (b. 1973) designed an original façade called On-Off as part of the “1% for art” initiative. That same year, the swimming pool, a unique feature of Augustin-Thierry, was permanently closed. It was eventually replaced with a new gymnasium in 2013.

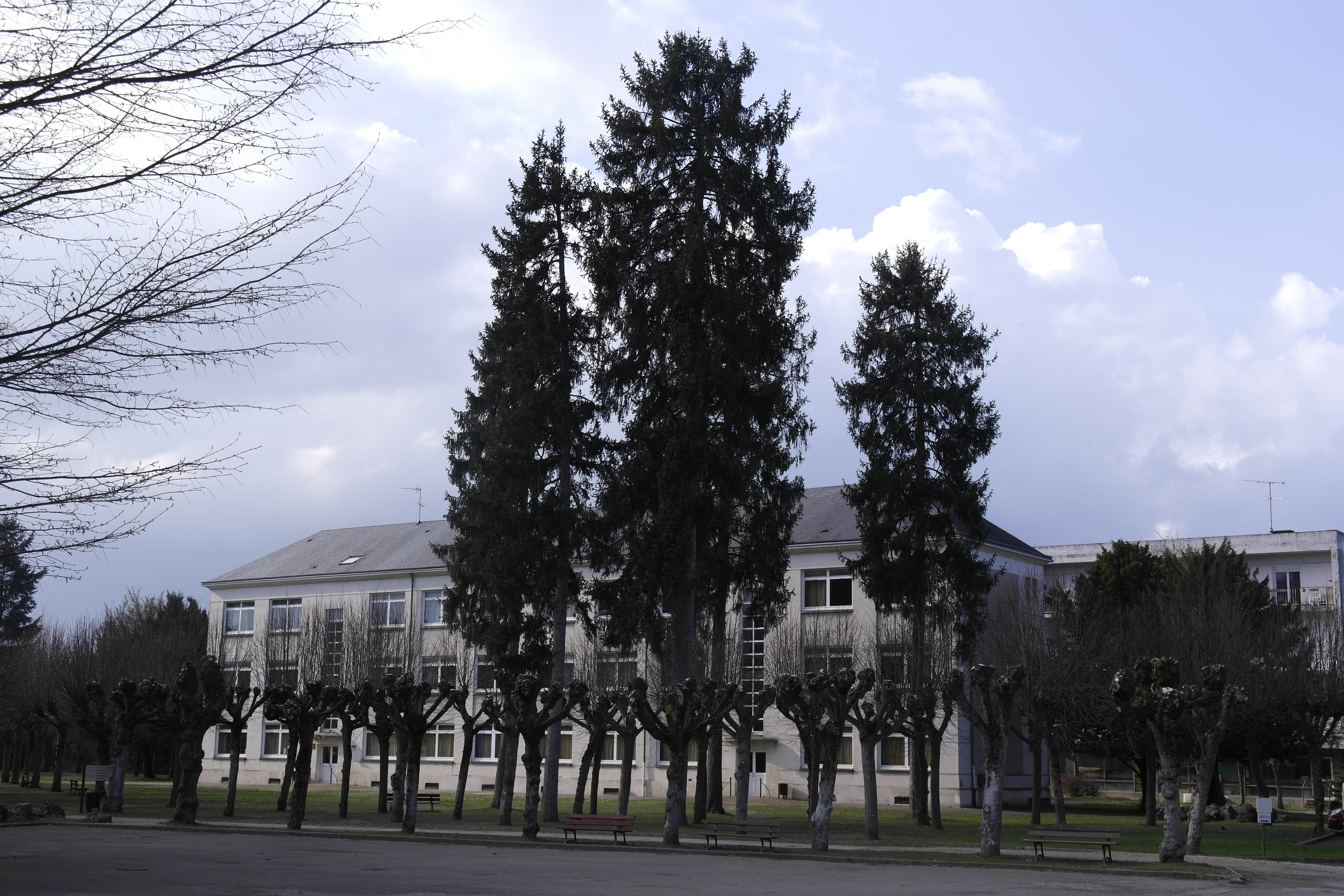
The Lavoisier building.

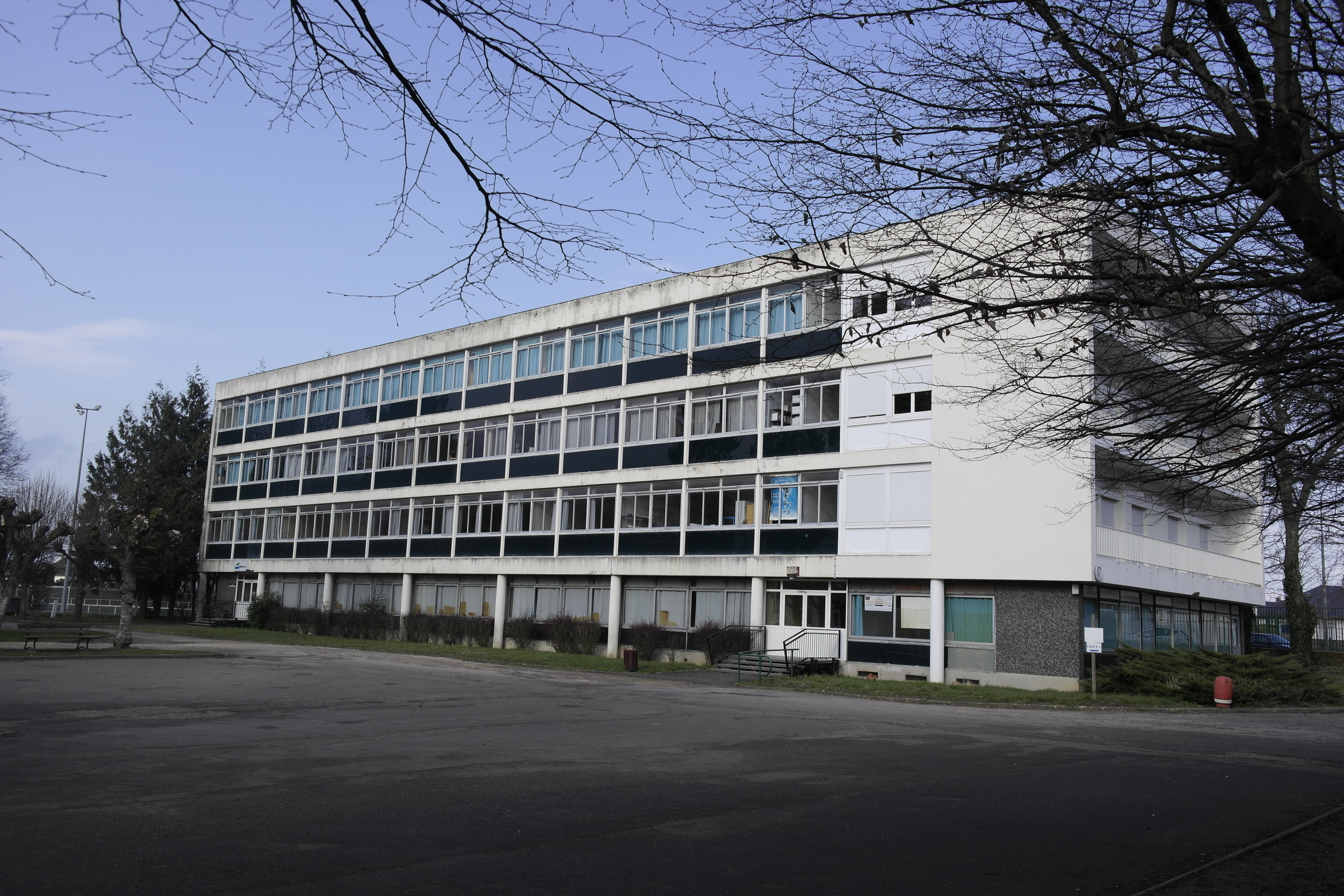
The Papin building.

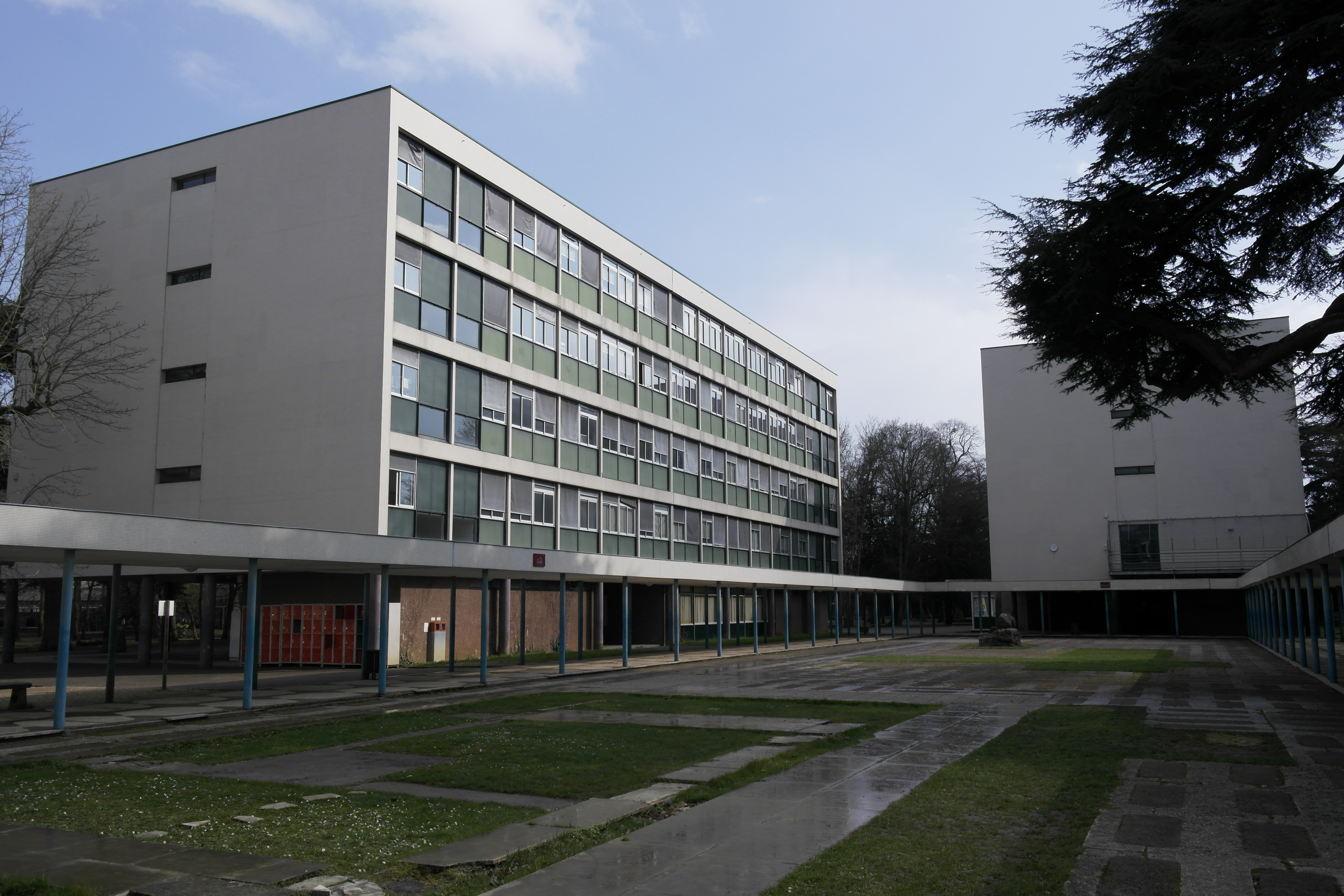
The Curie (left) and Descartes (right) buildings.

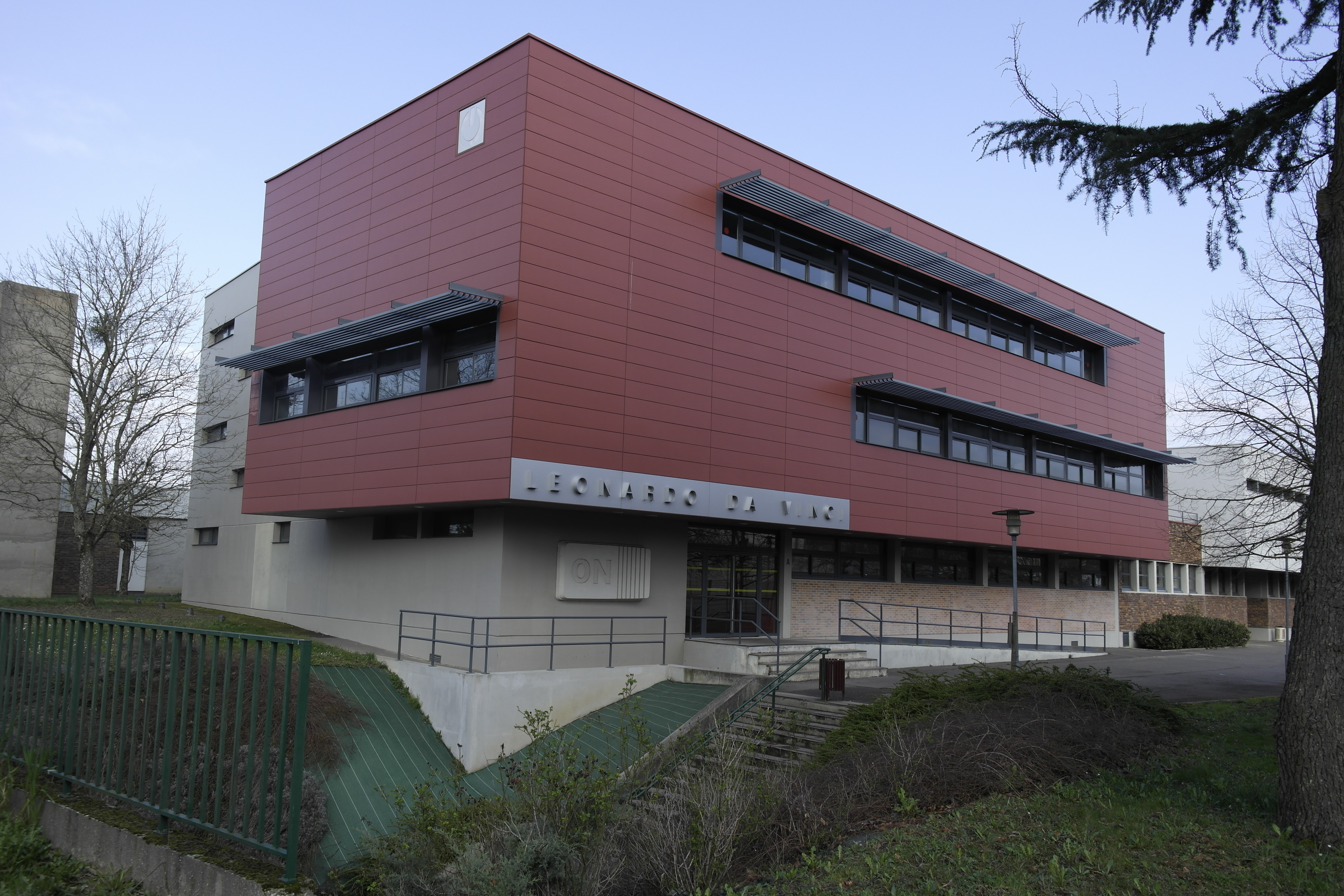
The Vinci building and its “On-Off” facade.

=== Park, flora, and fauna ===
In the time of Jean-Simon Chambert-Péan, the park surrounding the “Château Saint-Lazare” was planted with more or less rare species (Lebanon cedars, cherry plum trees, linden trees, etc.) that provided shelter for many birds and red squirrels. After the school complex was established, however, many of the trees in the park were cut down to make room for new buildings (especially Descartes and Curie). Only part of the 19th-century arboreal collection remains today, but it continues to be a defining feature of the school complex.

Some of the plant species present in the park of the school complex:

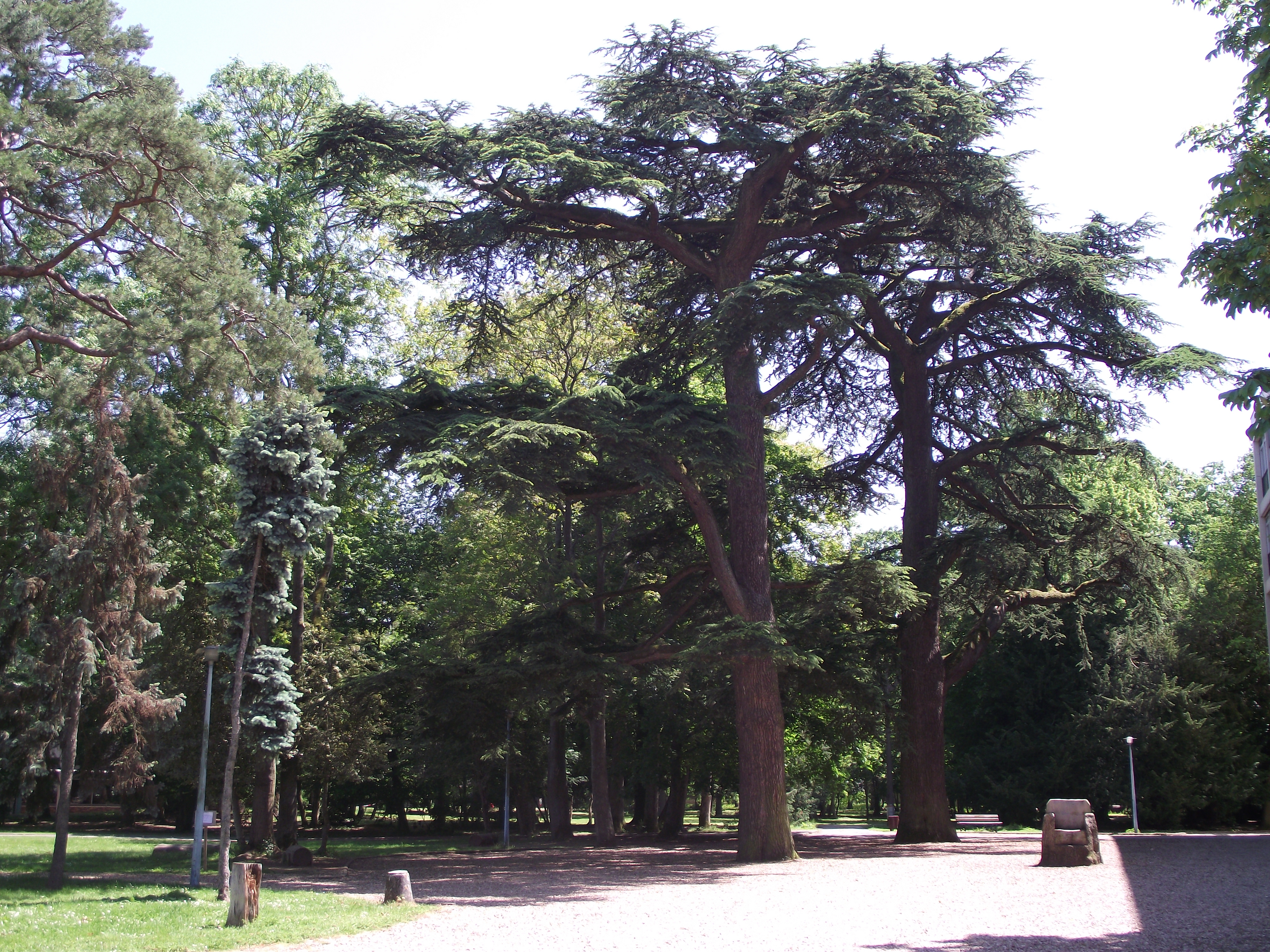
Lebanon cedar

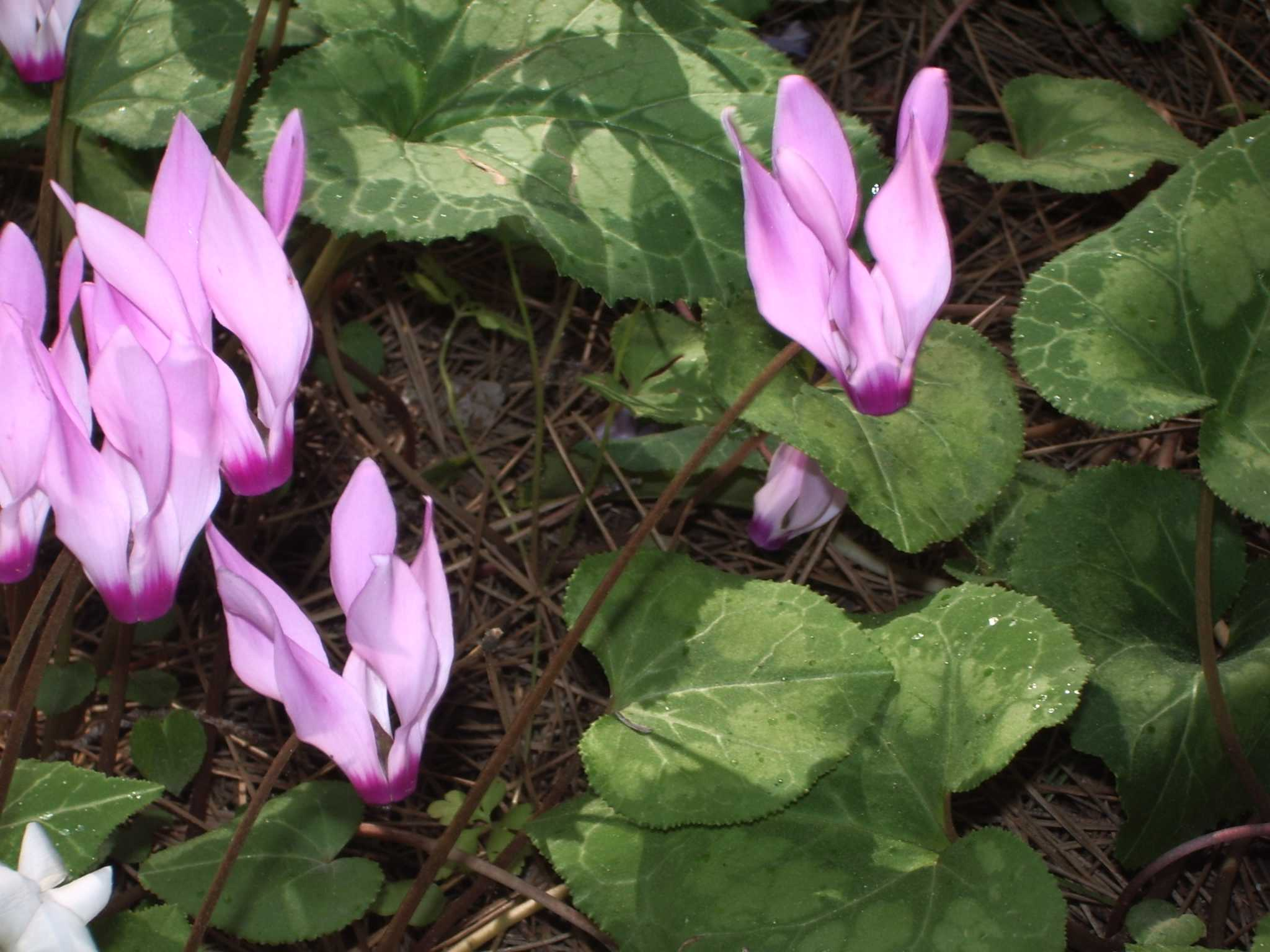
Sowbread

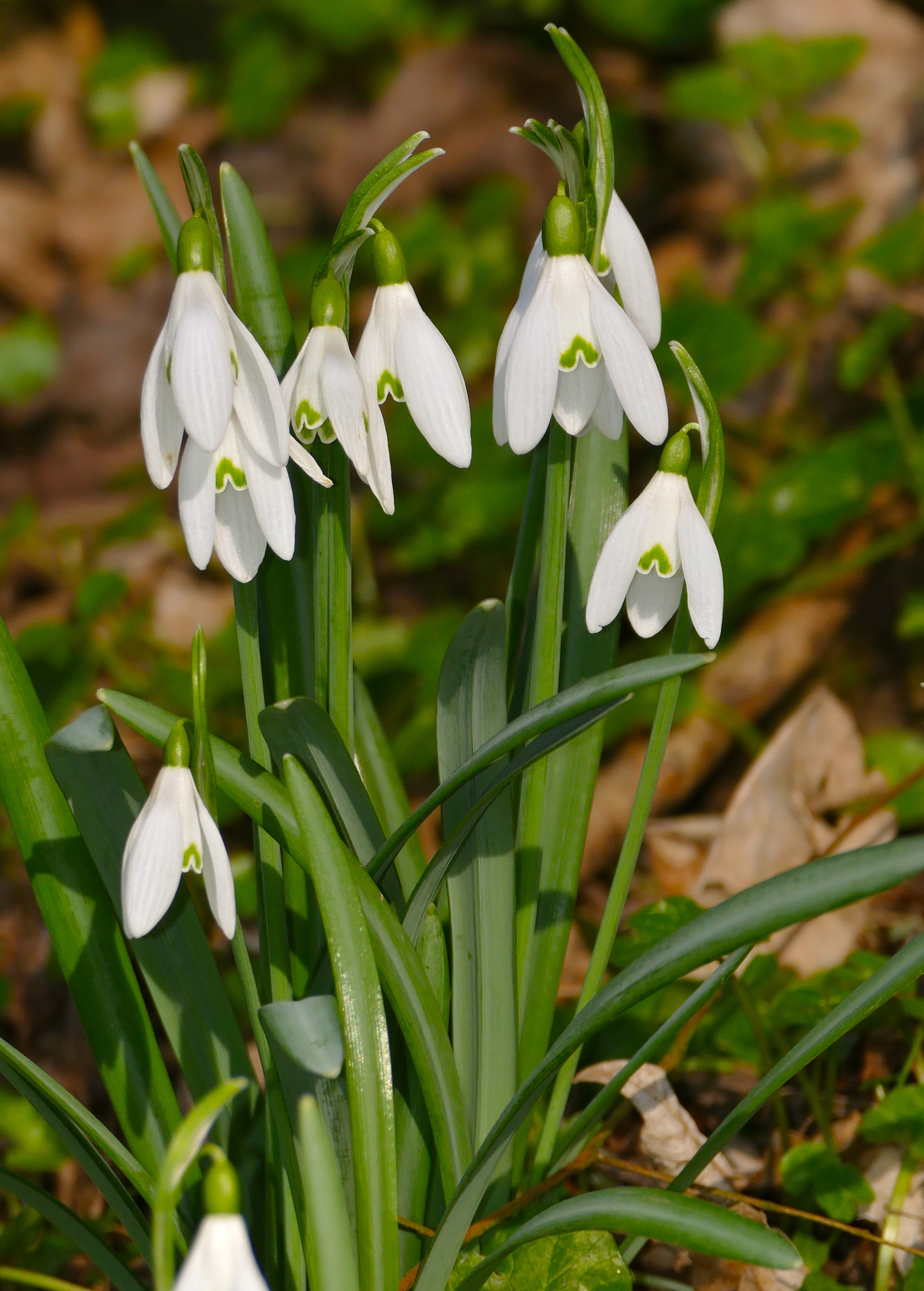
Snowdrop

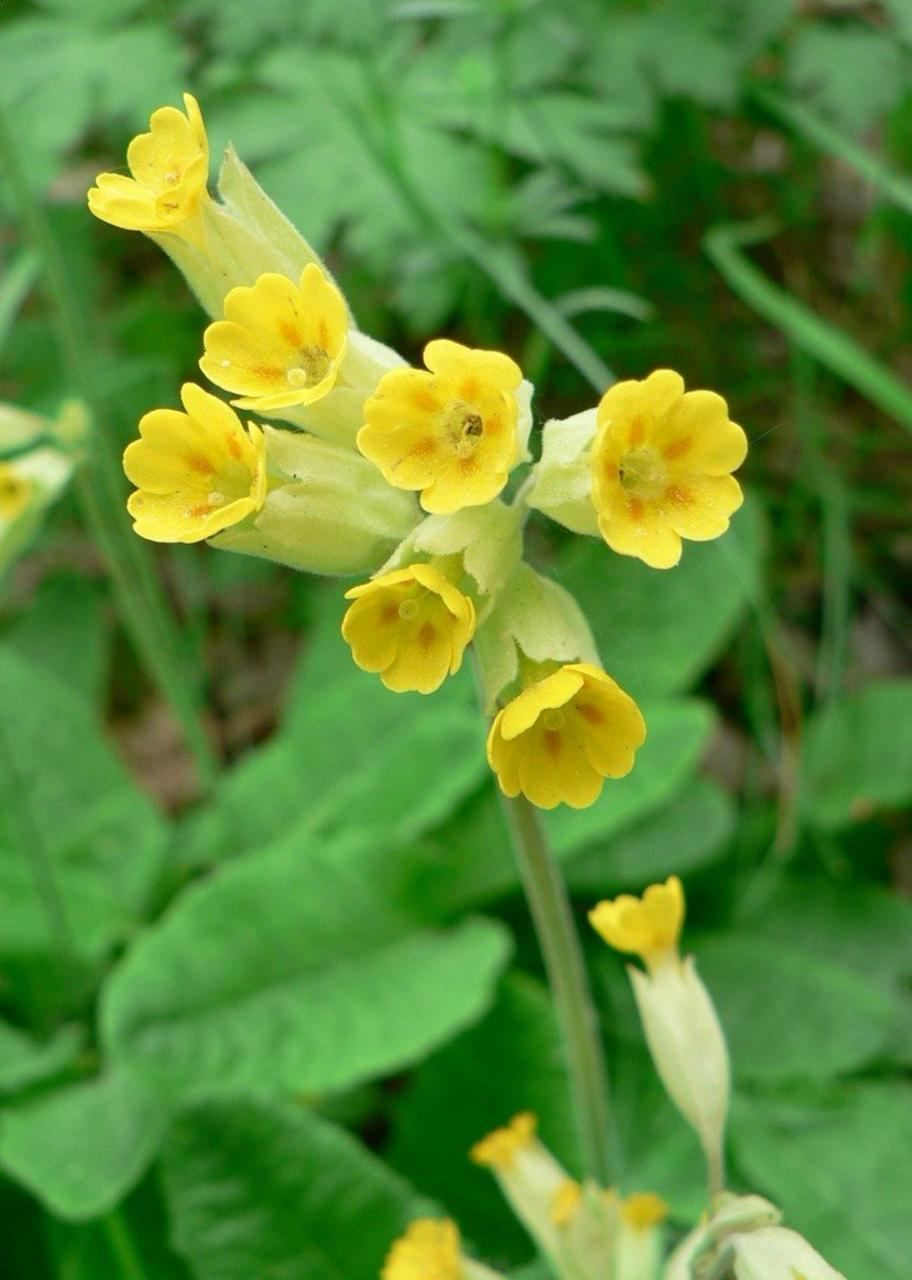
Cowslip

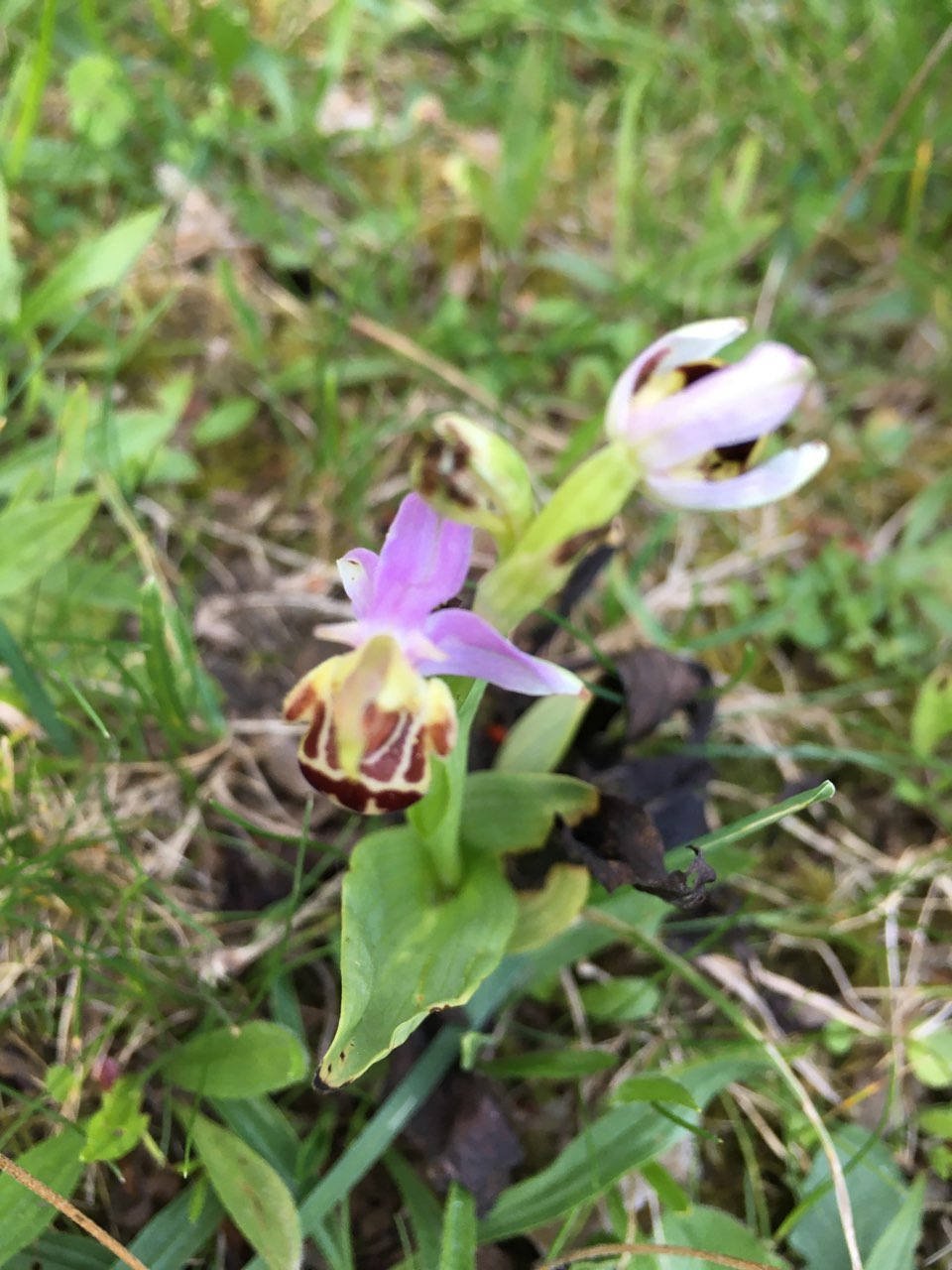
Bee orchid

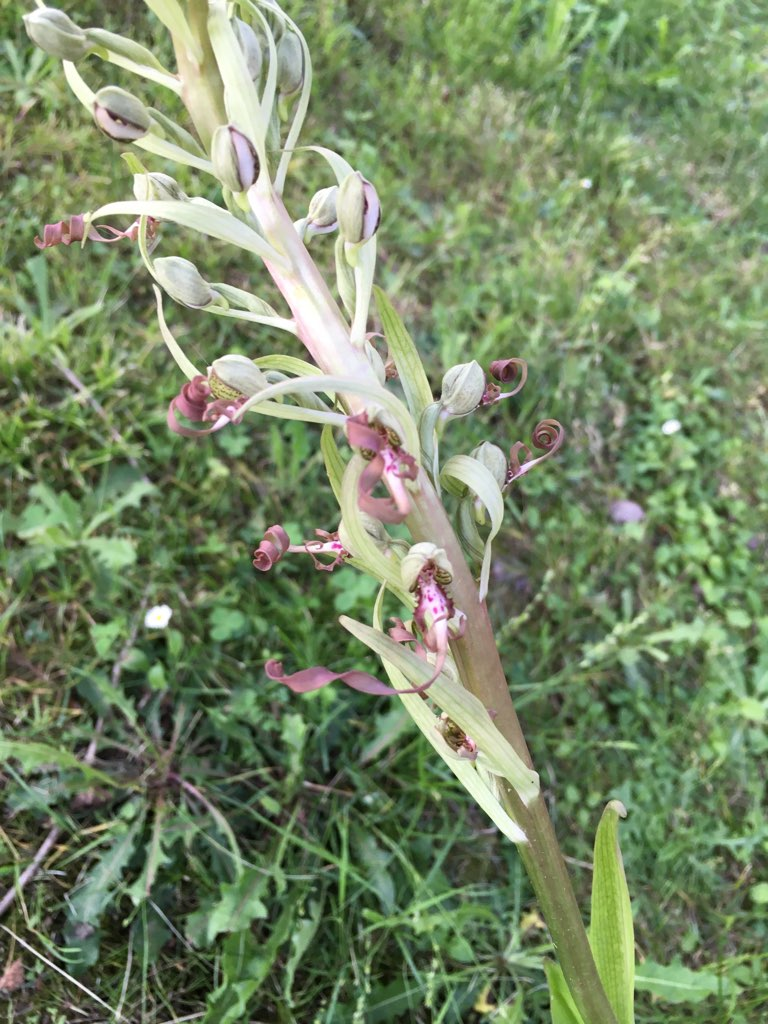
Lizard orchid

Some animal species present in the park:

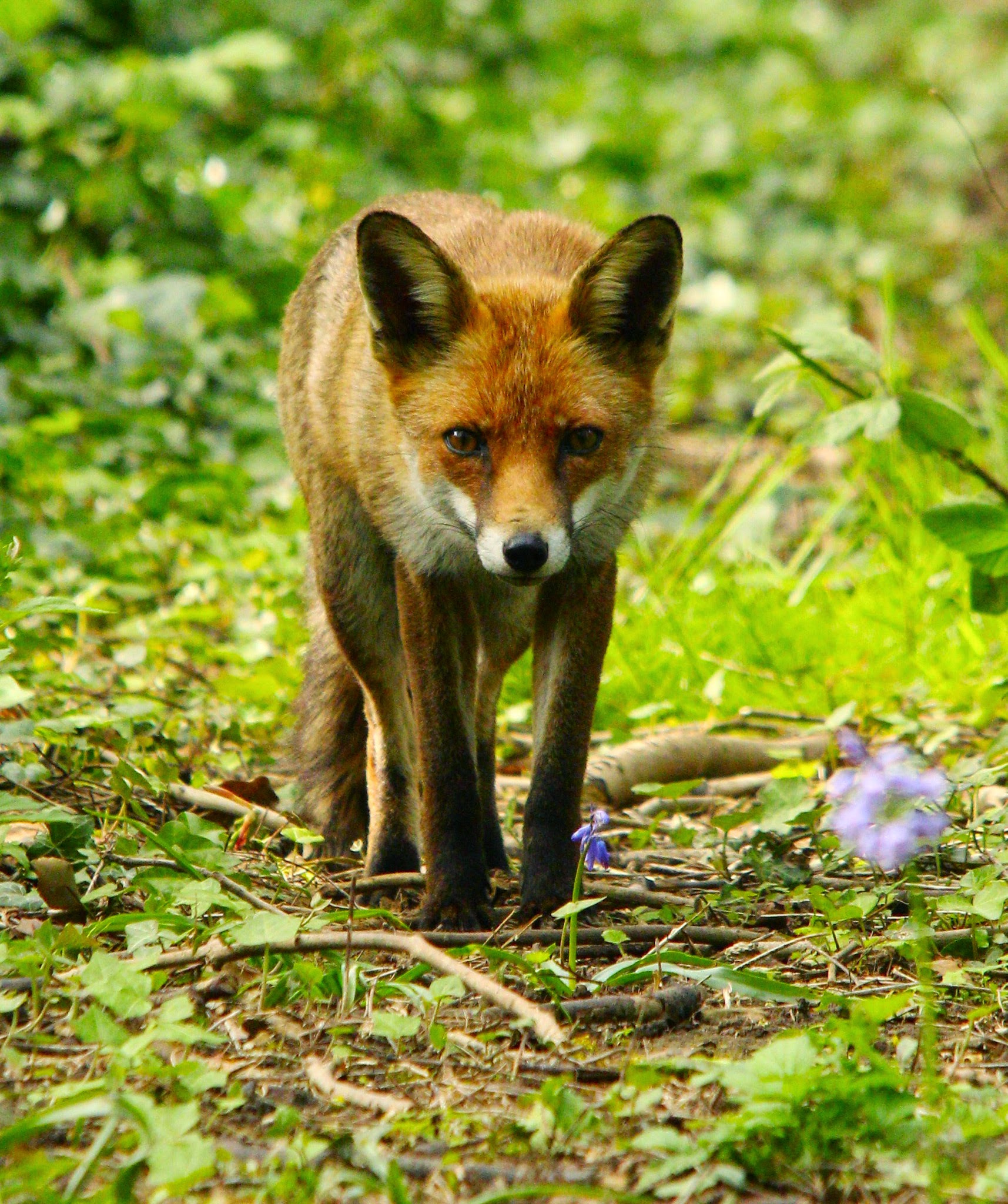
Red fox

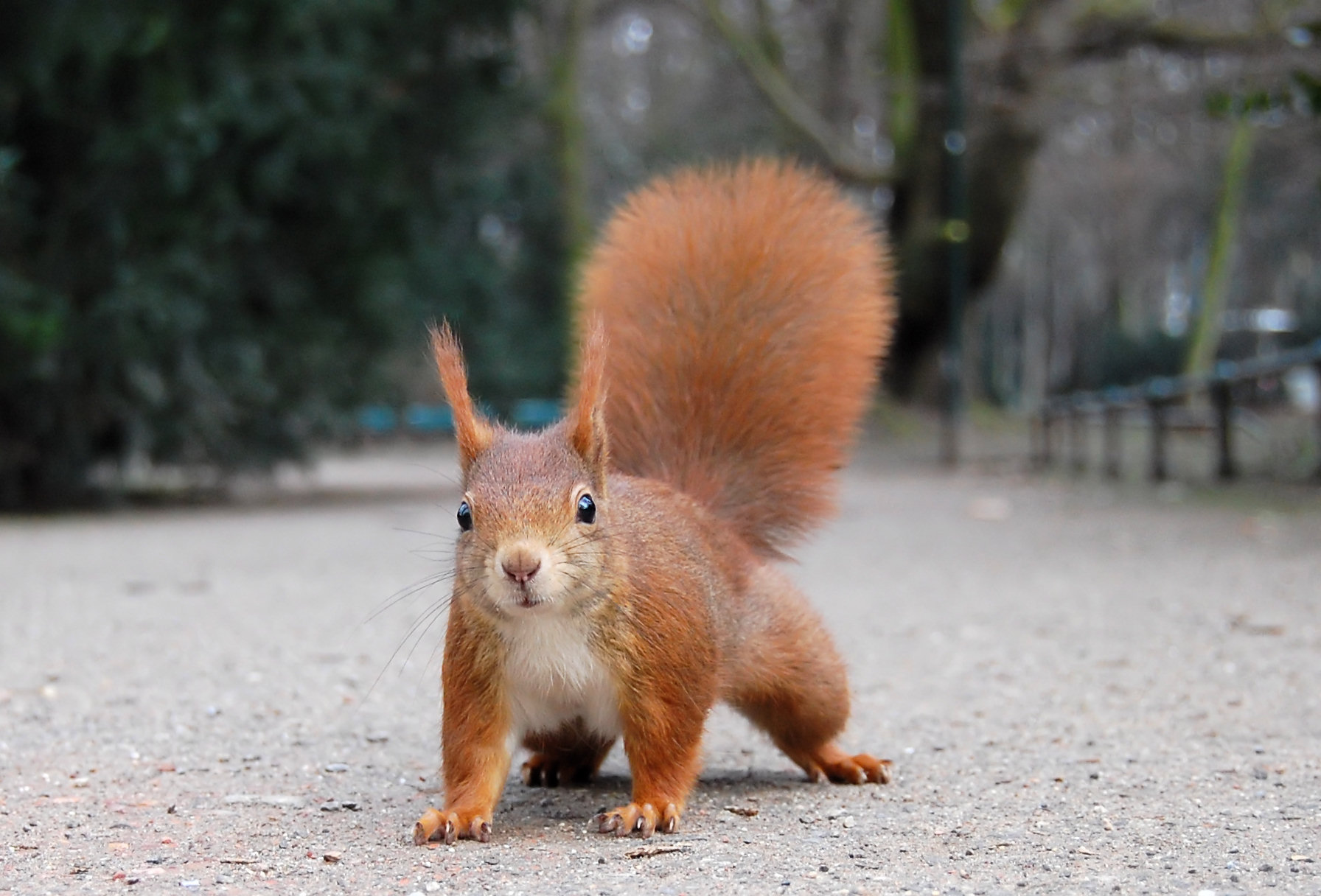
Red squirrel

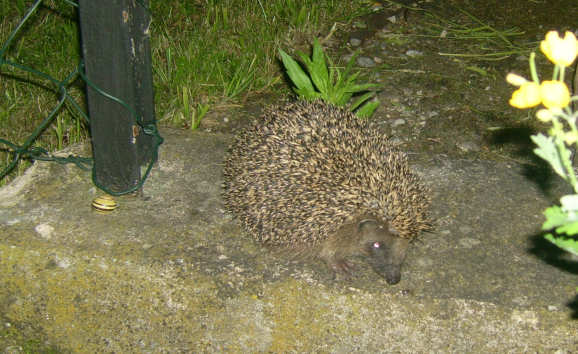
Hedgehog

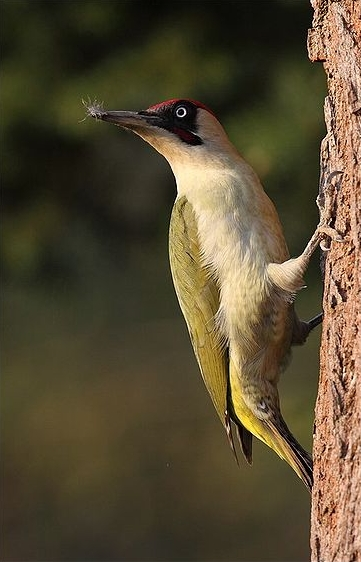
Green woodpecker

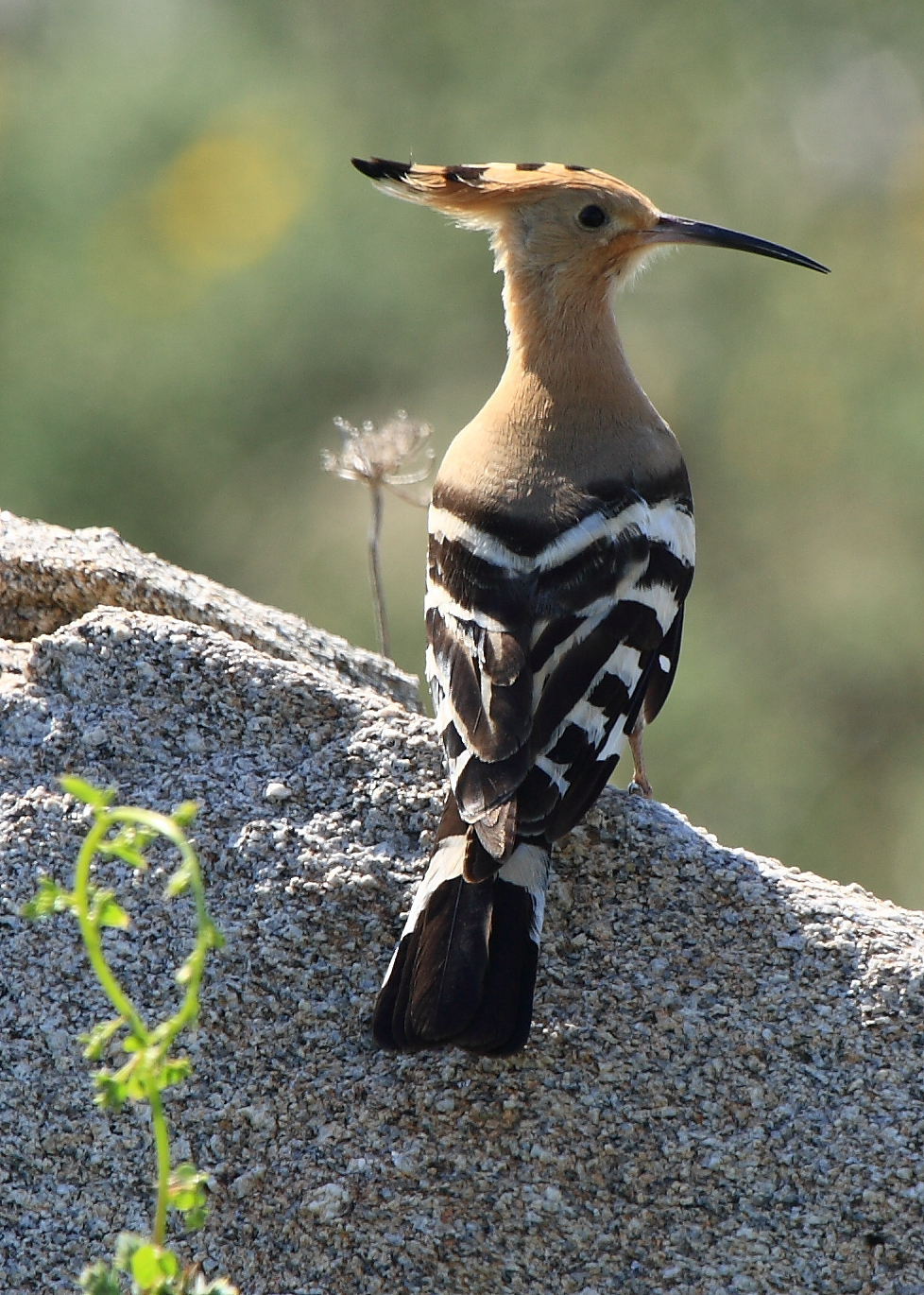
Eurasian hoopoe

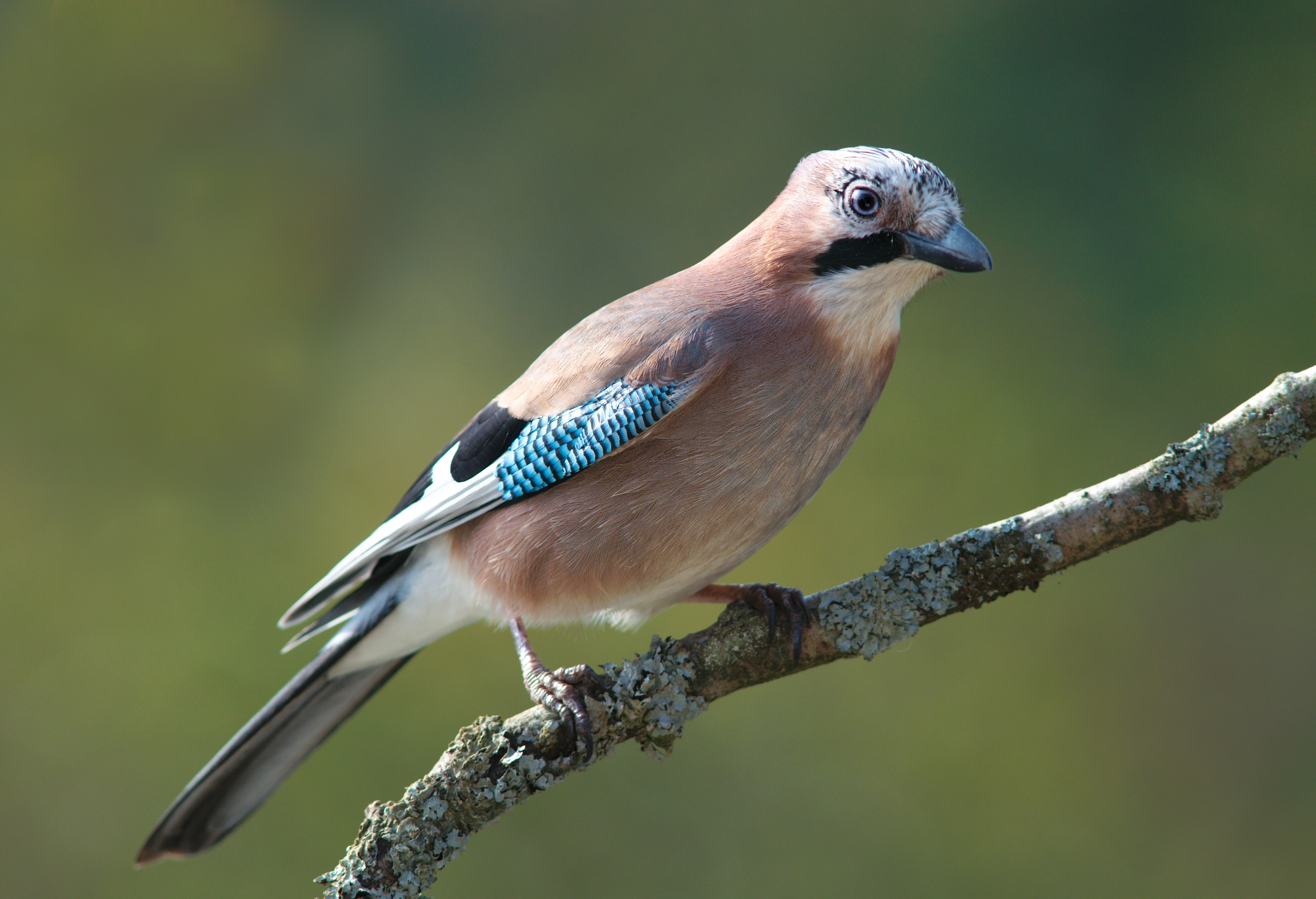
Eurasian jay

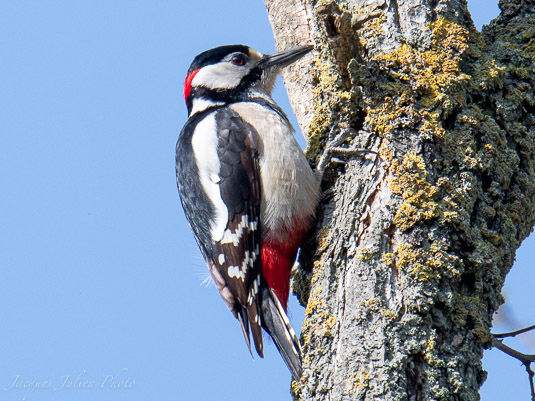
Great spotted woodpecker

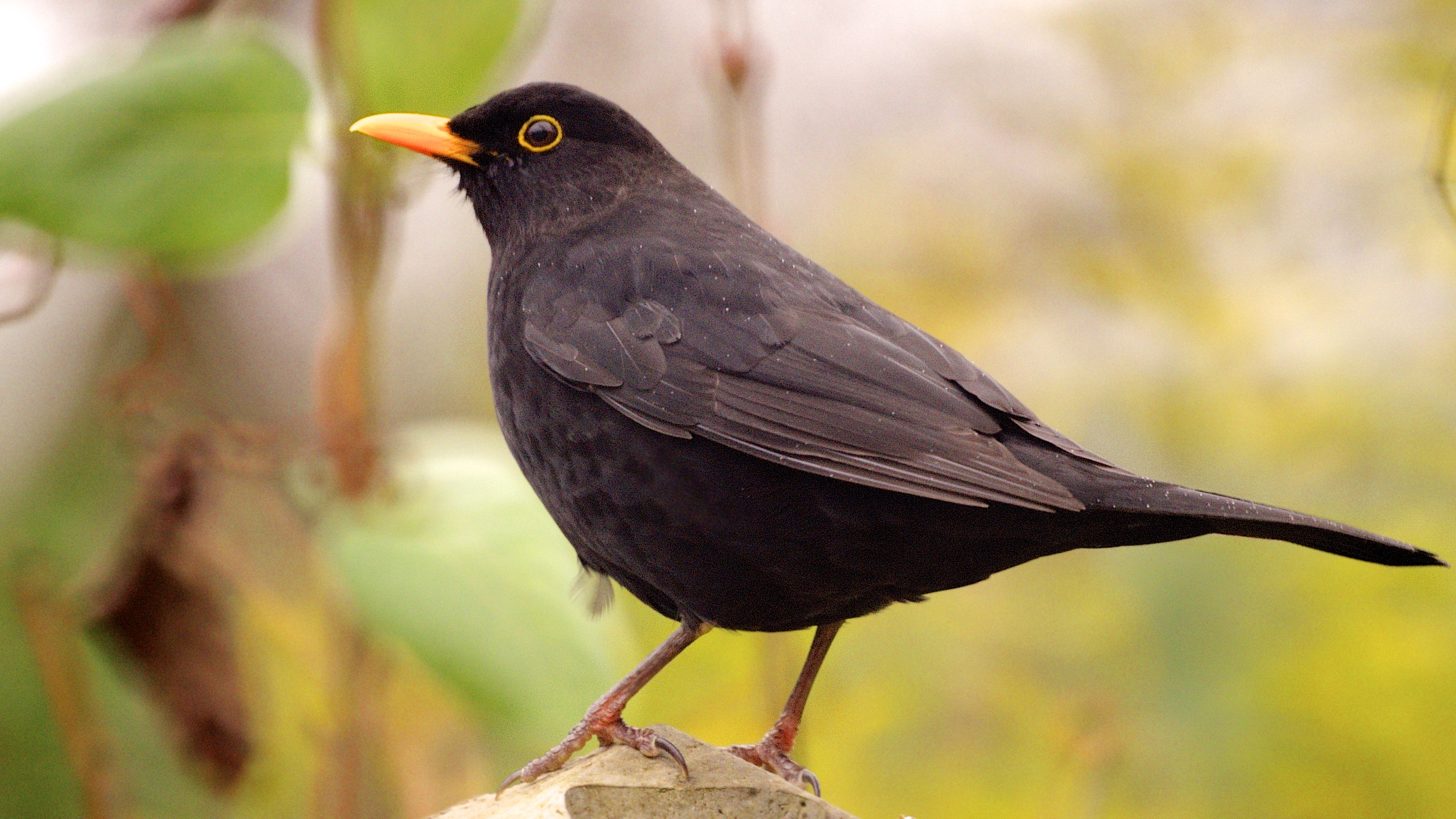
Common blackbird

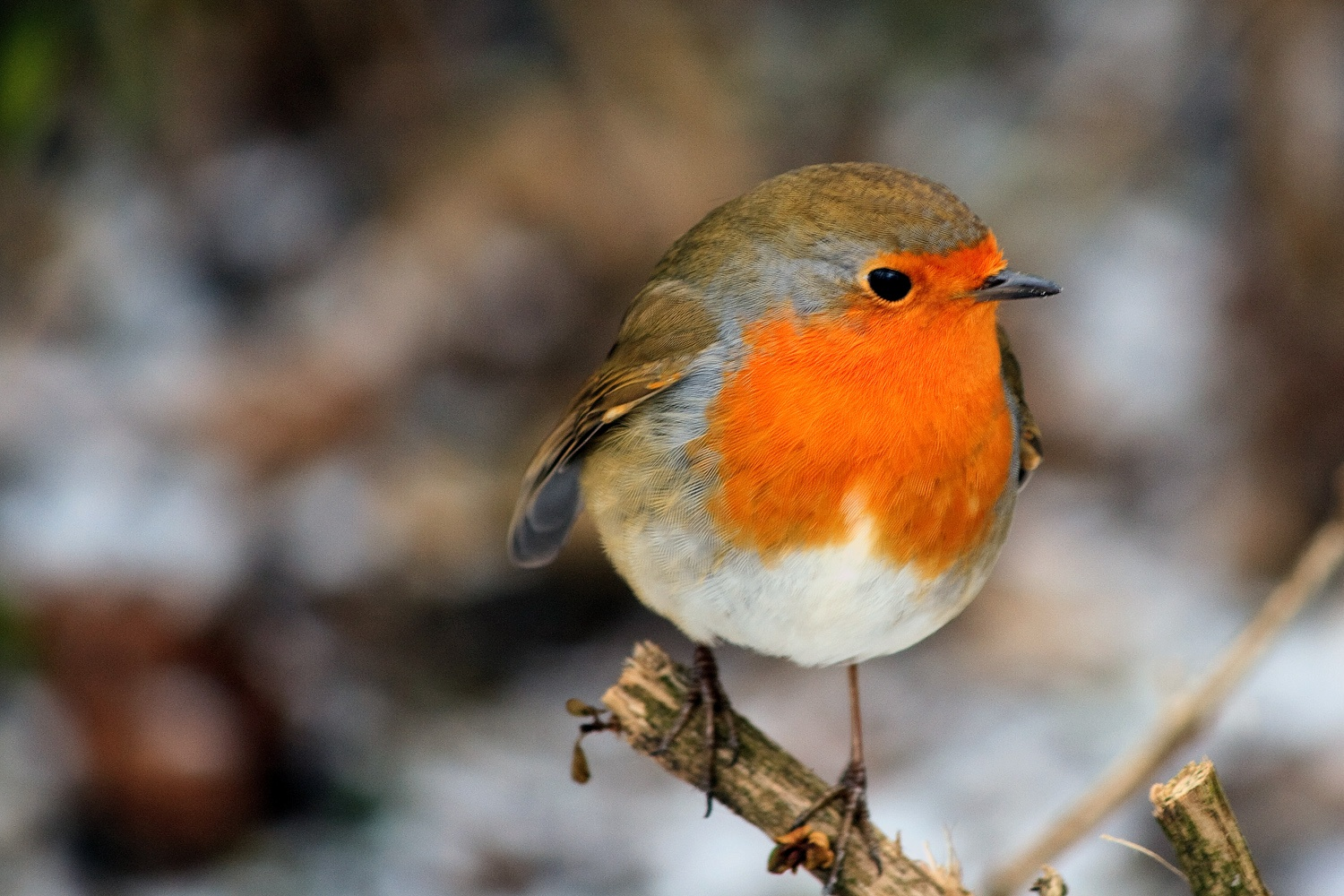
European robin

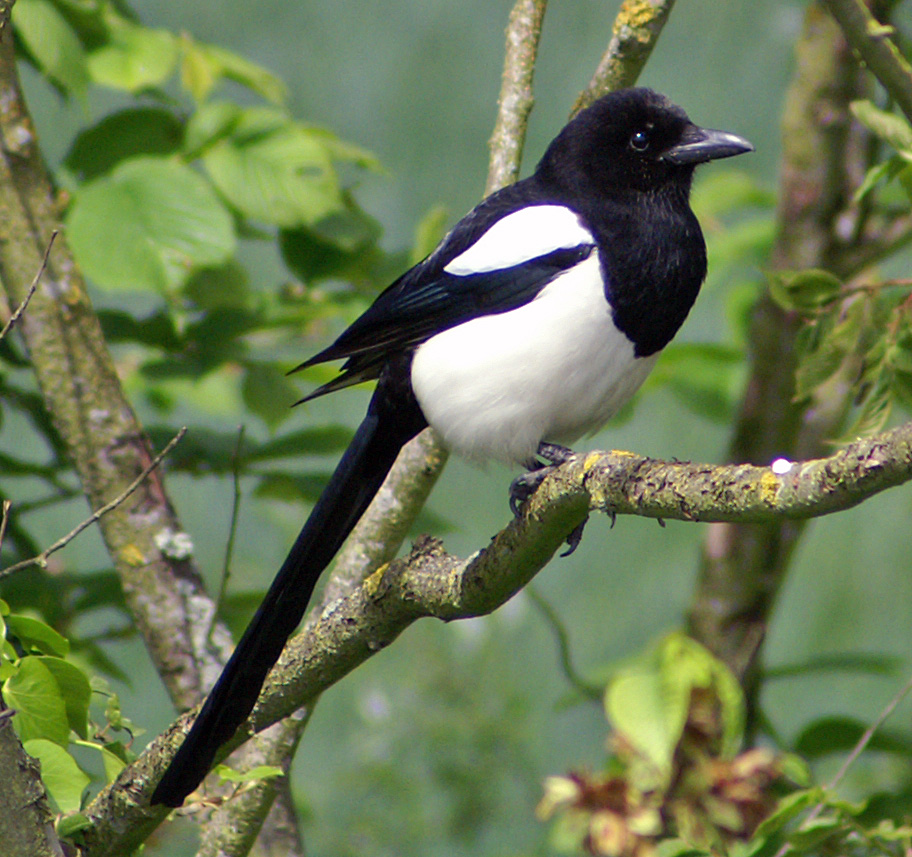
Eurasian magpie

=== Commemorative plaques ===
Five commemorative plaques located in front of the entrance to the school cafeteria commemorate the involvement of former students and teachers of the Robert-Badinter school complex in the various conflicts France has faced since the end of the 19th century:

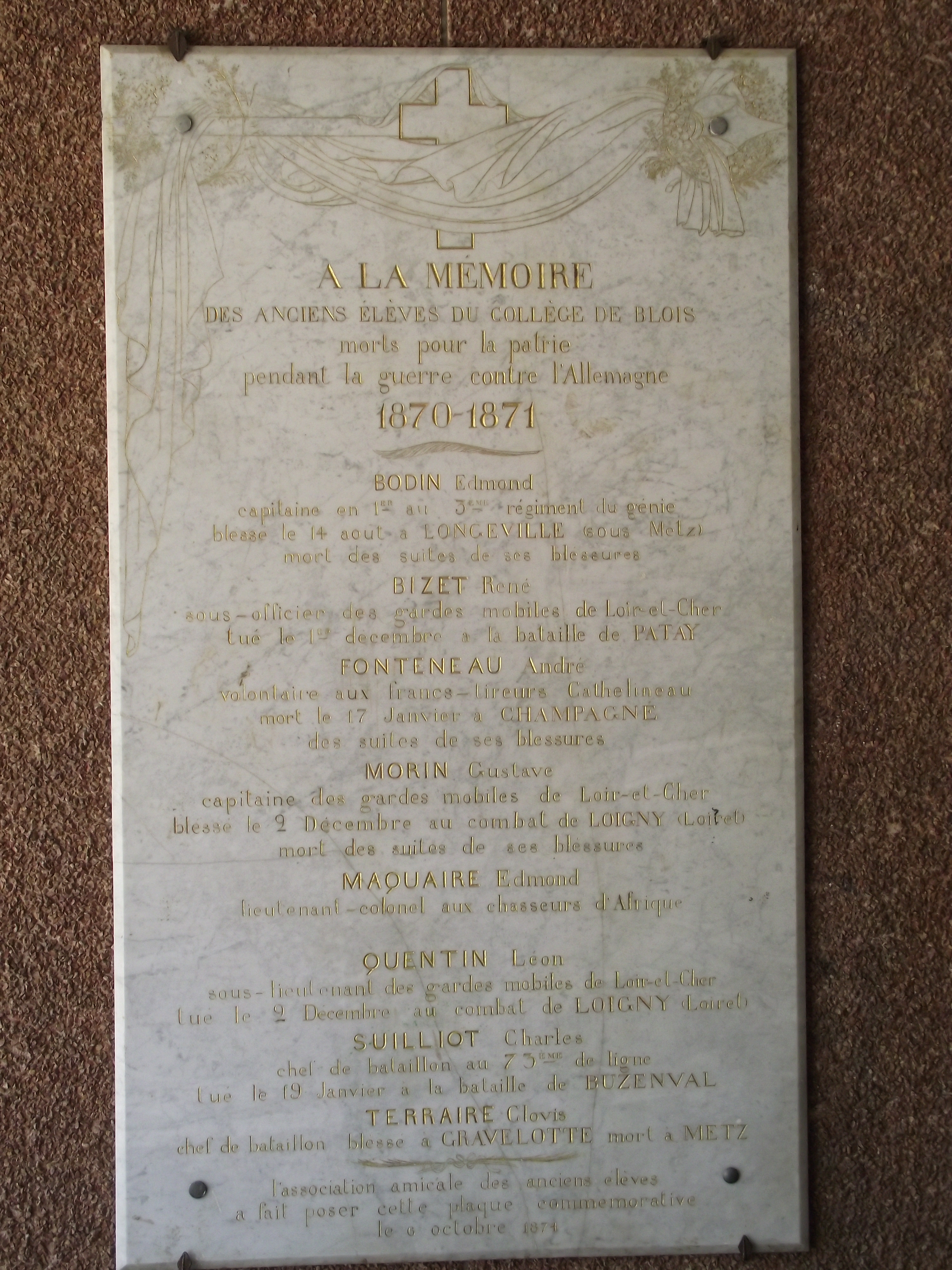
Former students who died during the Franco-German War of 1870.

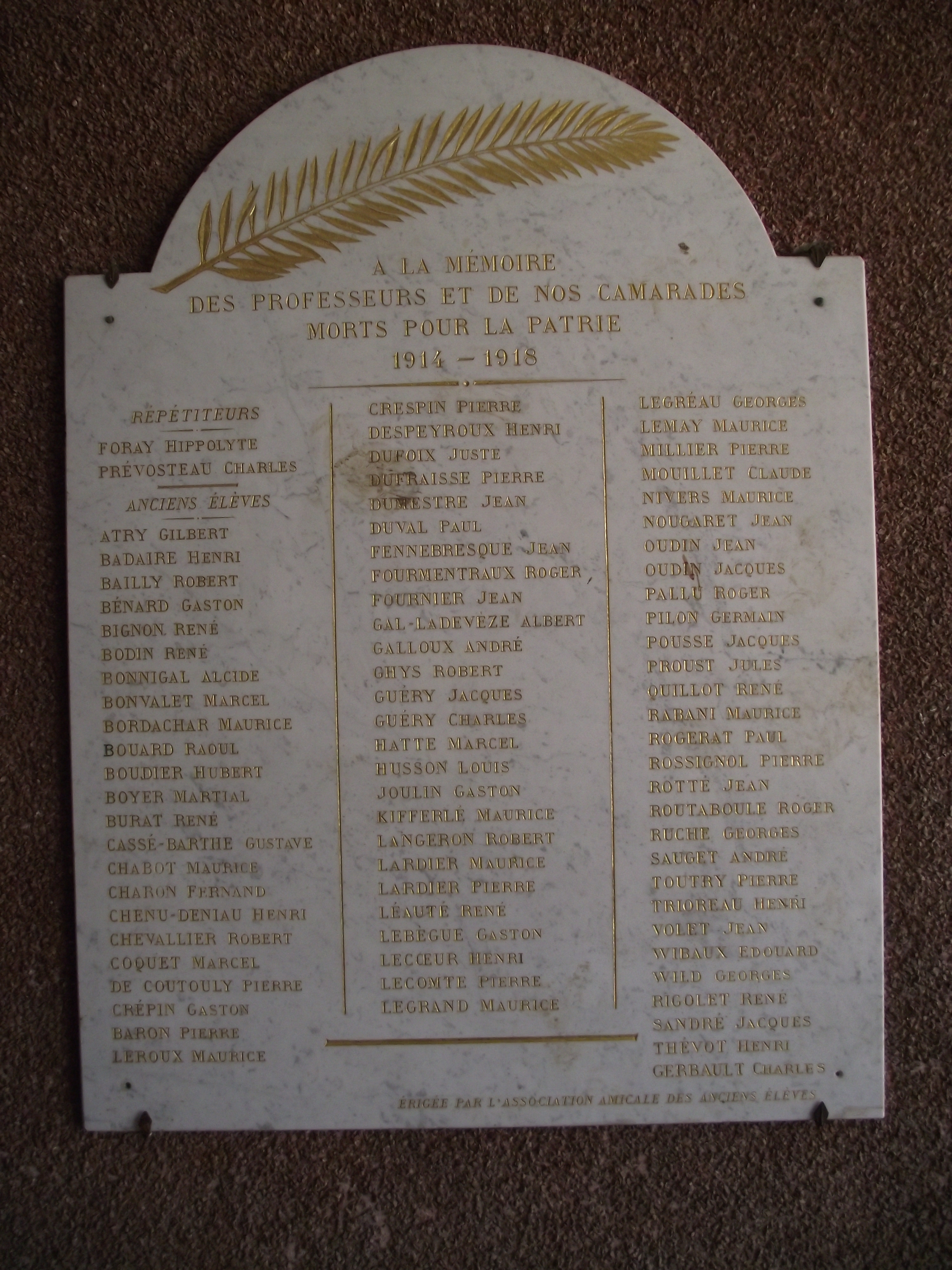
Former students and teachers who died during the First World War.

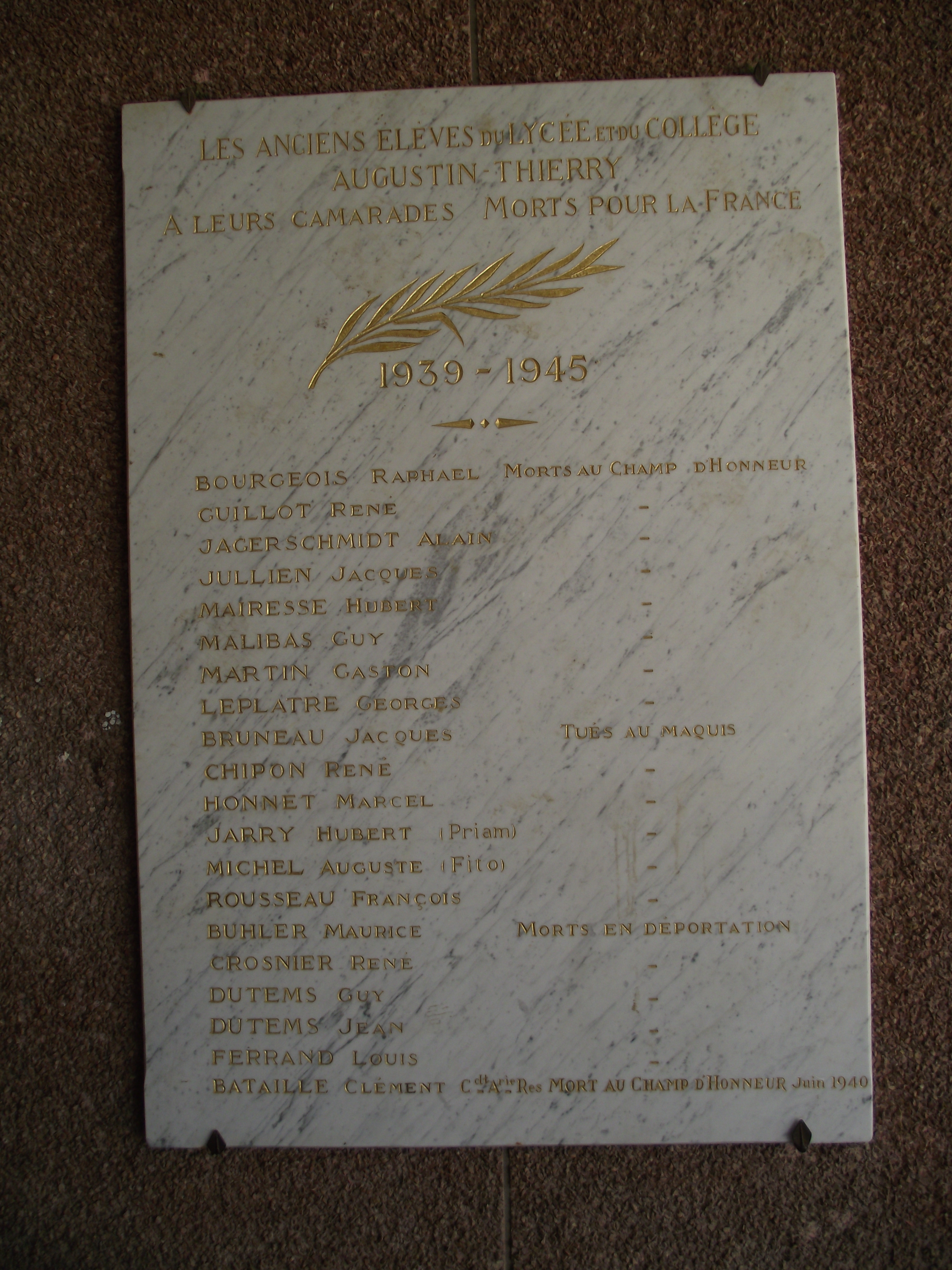
Former students who died during the Second World War.

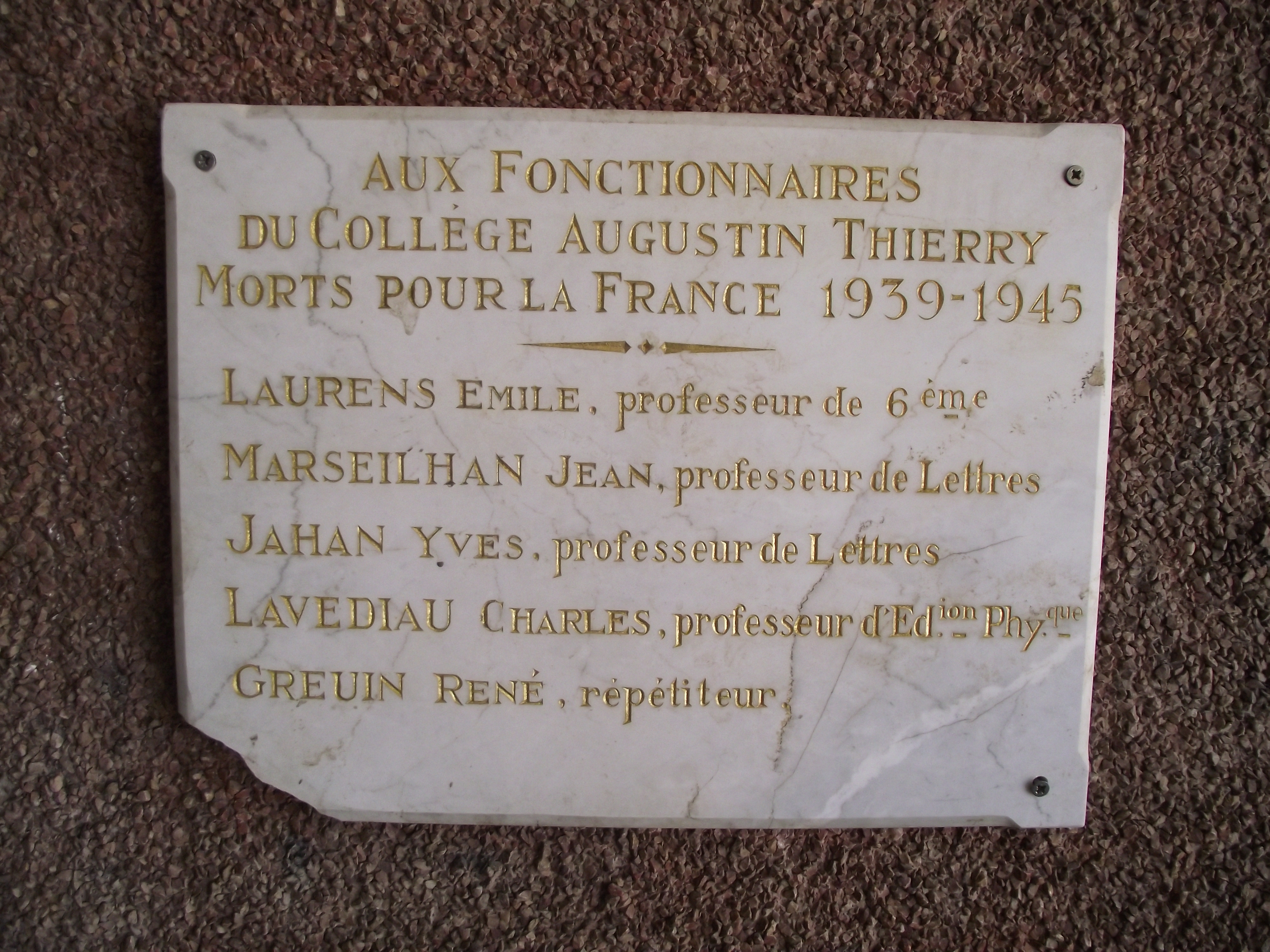
Former staff who died during the Second World War.

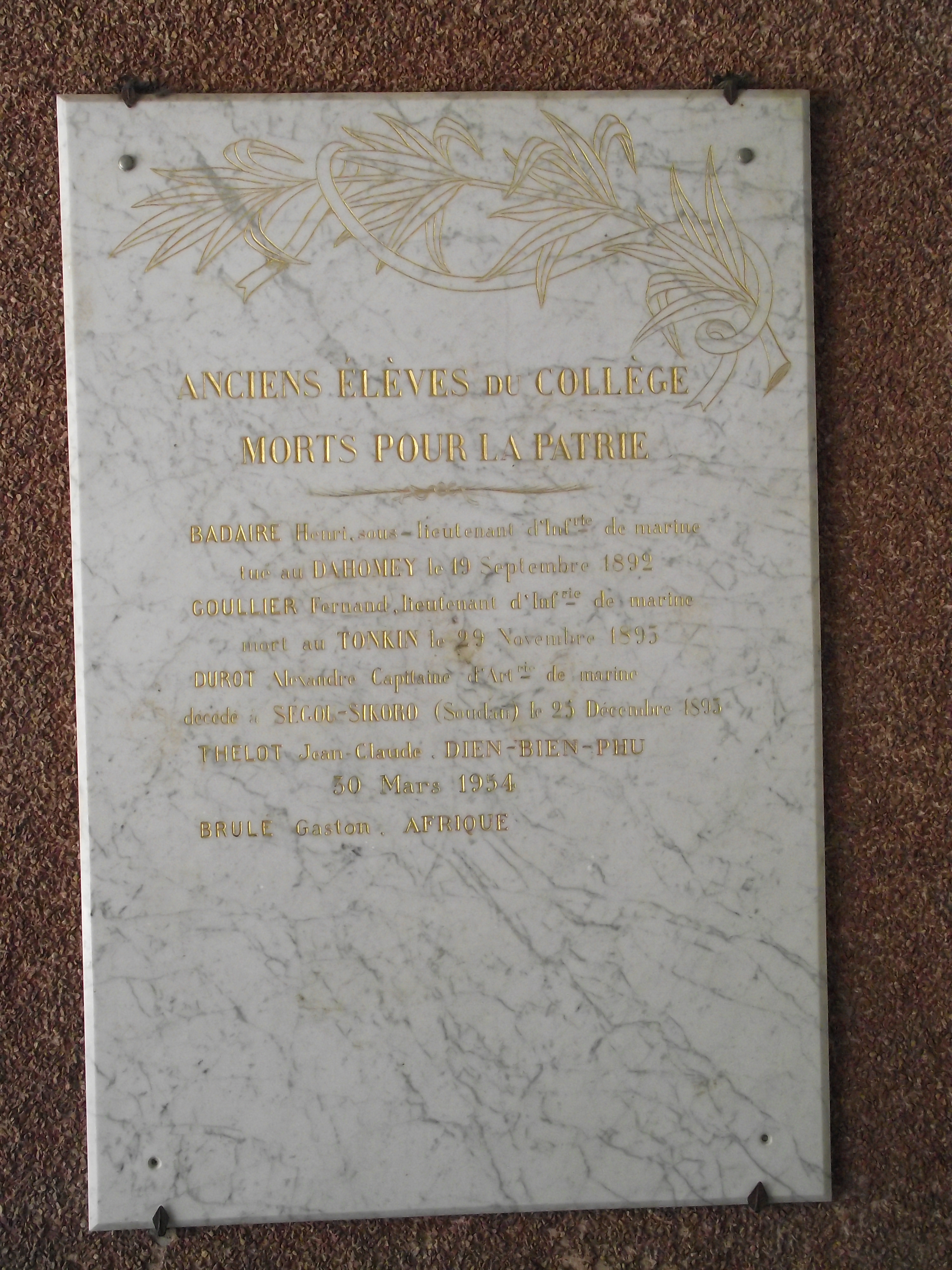
Former students who died during the colonial wars.

Outside the school complex, at No. 8 Bourg-Moyen Street, another plaque commemorates the former Bourg-Moyen college, which was bombed in 1940:

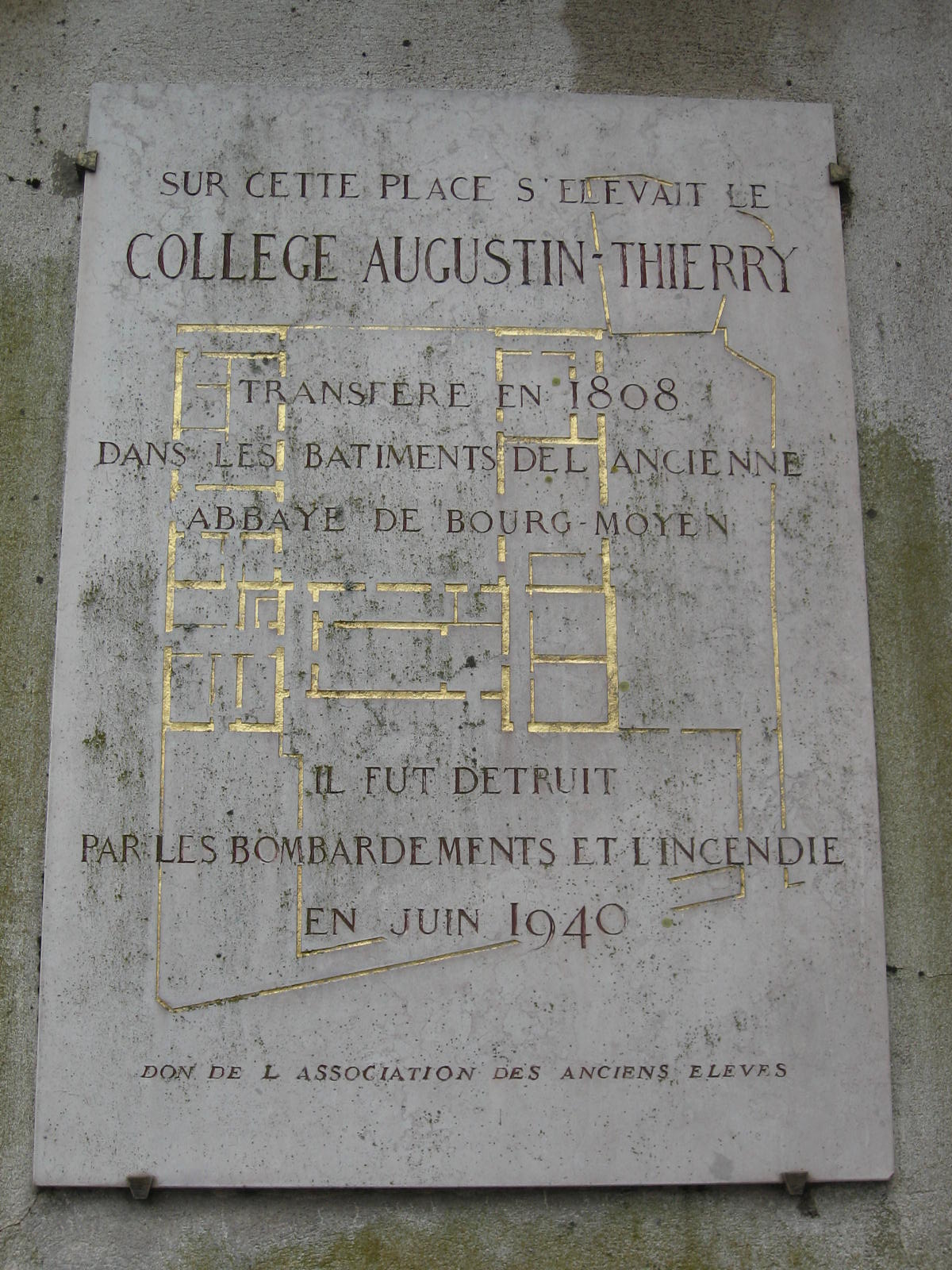
Former Bourg-Moyen secondary school.

== Administration and services ==
=== Governing bodies and assemblies ===
The operation of the Robert-Badinter school complex is similar to that of all French middle and high schools.

The middle school is governed by a school board (CA) composed of 24 members: 8 staff representatives, 8 representatives of parents and students, and 8 representatives of local authorities, the school administration, and qualified individuals. This board manages the school’s affairs and votes on, among other things, the school project, organizational rules, and the budget. Alongside the board are other bodies, including the Health and Citizenship Education Committee (CESC), responsible for citizenship education, violence prevention, support for parents in difficulty, and education on health, sexuality, and risk prevention.

The general and vocational high school (LGT and SEP), for its part, is headed by a school board (CA) composed of 30 members: 10 staff representatives, 10 representatives of parents and students, and 10 representatives of local authorities, the school administration, and qualified individuals. The functions of this board are the same as those of the middle school board. Alongside the board, there are various bodies: the Health and Citizenship Education Committee (CESC), whose role is the same as in the middle school; (Note: In 2016, the CESC (Health and Citizenship Education Committee) organized a prevention week on addictions for all second-year lycée students. See Lané, Chantal (March 12, 2016). "Une semaine contre les dépendances au lycée" [A Week Against Addictions at the Lycée]. La Nouvelle République (in French).) the Council of Student Life Delegates (CVL), which gives its opinion on the organization of school time, individual work, information on guidance and health; and the Health and Safety Committee (CHS), which contributes to the protection of health and safety and the improvement of working conditions.

Finally, within each class of the institution, two student presidents represent their classmates during class councils or disciplinary councils.

=== Principal's office, student life offices, and management services ===
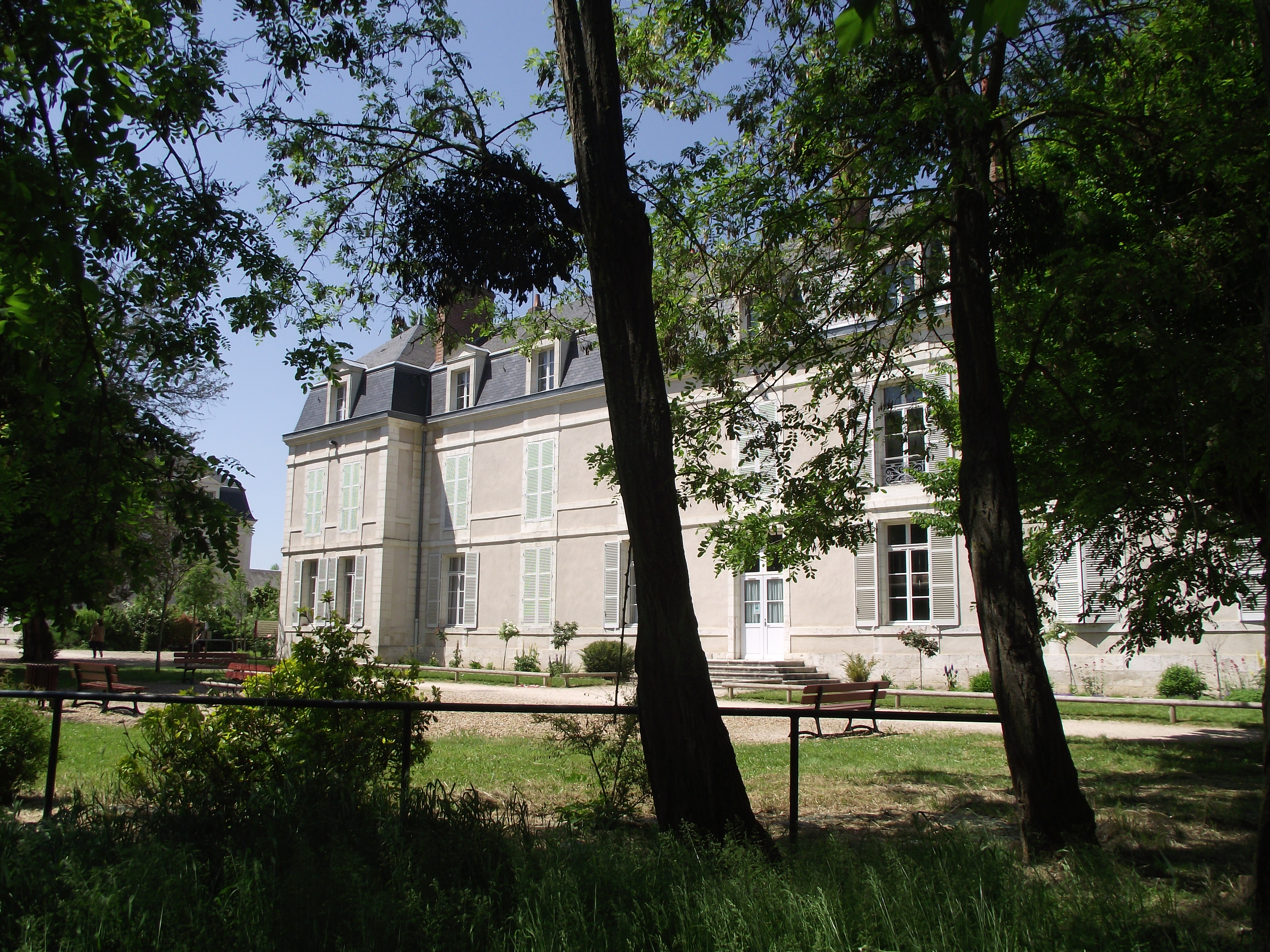
The Lunier building in 2012.

The Lunier building houses the principal’s office of the school complex. It contains the offices of the principal, Jérôme Lauxire (head of the institution since January 2020), and his deputies: Rémi Artige (head of the general high school since the 2024 school year), Christelle Moulin (head of the vocational section since 2021), and Karine Harribey (head of the middle school since 2021). The various school secretariats are also located in the Lunier building.

The high school student life office is centralized in the Glaïeuls building. However, annexes are located in different parts of the school complex: the Descartes building for the general high school and the Lavoisier and Vinci buildings for the vocational section. The middle school student life office is located in the Curie building. Four senior education advisors (CPE), supported by education assistants, ensure supervision and student support.

The management office is located in the Balzac building. Led by a team of nine people headed by deputy manager William Feldle, the management office oversees around sixty ATOSS staff members, including a concierge, gardeners, an electrician, a plumber, secretaries, etc.

=== Boarding school, infirmary, and food services ===
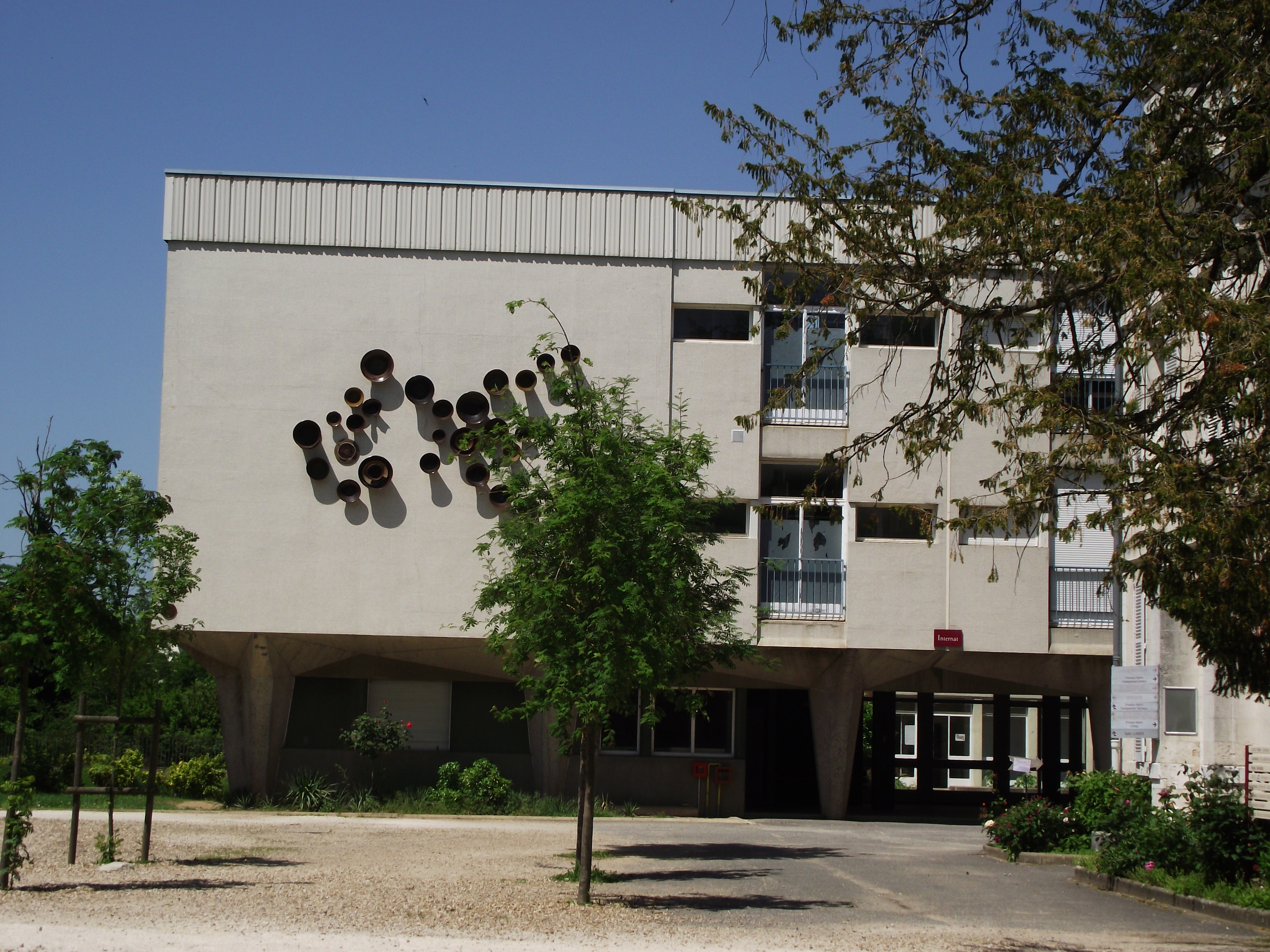
The boarding school of the lycée, May 2012.

Located in the Joséphine-Baker building, the boarding school is open to students (both boys and girls) of the institution and to students from the Camille-Claudel High School. Composed of around sixty rooms accommodating an average of four students each, the boarding school has 216 places: 148 for boys and 68 for girls. Each floor has four bathrooms, each equipped with eight showers and sixteen sinks.

The Joséphine-Baker building also houses the infirmary, open to students every weekday from 7:30 a.m. to 9:15 p.m. (except Fridays when it closes at 6:00 p.m.). From Monday to Thursday, the infirmary is also accessible overnight for boarders.

Located in the Balzac building, the school cafeteria employs a head chef (David Juranville, four cooks, four kitchen assistants, and a storekeeper, in addition to seven service staff. The cafeteria serves an average of 1,200 lunches daily (between 11:15 a.m. and 1:15 p.m.), as well as 200 breakfasts and dinners. The products served are sourced from local or regional suppliers (Tours fish market for fish, local producers and wholesalers for vegetables, etc.). To ensure hygiene, the school cafeteria uses a control system upon product reception and maintains product traceability.

=== Middle School CDI and High School 4C ===
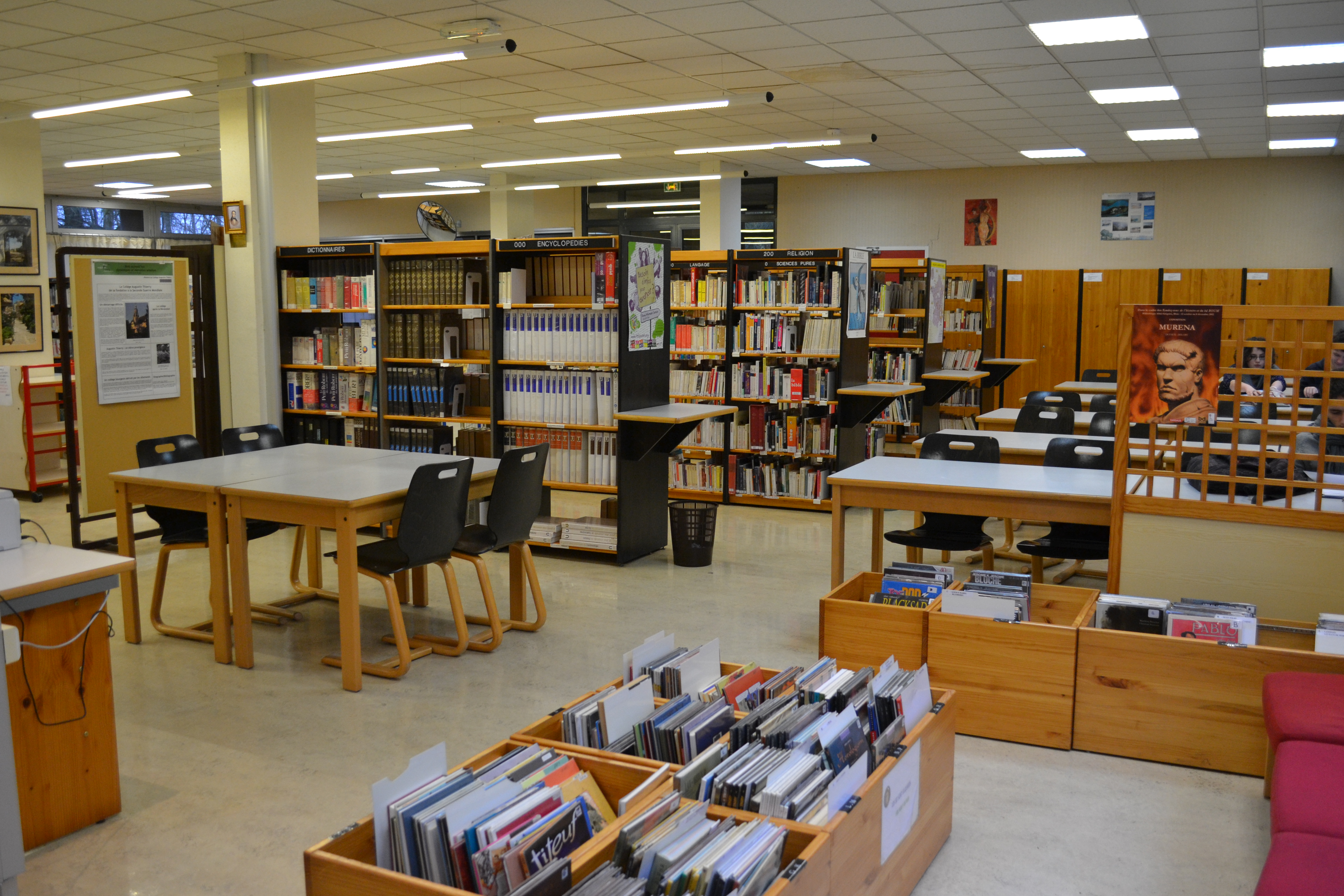
The reading room of the former CDI of the lycée, as it appeared in 2013.

Managed by two teacher-librarians, the middle school’s documentation and information center (CDI) is open to students every day from 8:00 a.m. to 12:00 p.m. and from 1:00 p.m. to 4:00 p.m., except Wednesday (closes at noon) and Friday (closes at 2:00 p.m.). The middle school CDI has several missions: to encourage students to read, seek guidance, learn about research methods, do their homework, and participate in various contests.

Run by two teacher-librarians, the connected knowledge and culture center (4C, formerly CDI) of the high school is divided into four areas: a 46-seat workroom, a 12-seat reading corner, a 15-seat group workroom, and two computer rooms with 20 computers. The 4C is open every day from 8:00 a.m. to 6:00 p.m., except Wednesday (closes at 1:00 p.m.) and Friday (closes at 5:00 p.m.). Its mission is to gather and manage a collection of documents that meet the informational needs of students and the educational staff. It also aims to help students master information literacy and contribute to their cultural enrichment.

=== MDL and gymnasiums ===
The Jean-Germanaud High School Student House (Maison des Lycéens, MDL) serves as a cafeteria, a space for various school clubs (music, dance, photography, robotics, school newspaper), and a game room. It houses a pool table, a foosball table, and various board games for students. The MDL also functions as the school's social-educational center, succeeding the FSE (Social-Educational Fund) created after May 1968. For several years, the high school’s MDL was the only one of its kind in Blois. It even served as a source of inspiration for students at the Sonia-Delaunay High School when they decided to create their own in 2009.

The school complex has two gymnasiums, the largest and most recent of which dates back to 2013. Additionally, it has a sports hall and multipurpose outdoor courts suitable for basketball, tennis, handball, and running.

== Educational and cultural offerings ==
=== Middle School ===
==== School curriculum at the Middle School ====
In addition to the ten core subjects (French, mathematics, history-geography, moral and civic education, life and Earth sciences, physics-chemistry, technology, music, visual arts, and physical education and sports), and personalized academic support, sixth-grade students at Augustin-Thierry Middle School are required to study English as their first foreign language (LV1). Despite the “2015 middle school reform” (which led to the closure of the English-Spanish dual-language section at the school), they can still enroll in the English-German bilingual class.

In seventh grade, students’ schedules become more extensive. If they did not choose the bilingual section in sixth grade, they must study a second foreign language (LV2), either German or Spanish. They must also take two interdisciplinary practical courses (EPI). If they wish, they can also begin studying Latin through the “Ancient Languages and Cultures” option. In eighth grade, the curriculum continues directly from the seventh-grade program. In ninth grade, students face a heavier workload in preparation for the national diploma (brevet). In addition to the subjects already studied, students may choose to start studying Ancient Greek. They also complete a work placement in a company.

The Augustin-Thierry Middle School has a specialized unit for inclusive education (ULIS), designed to support students with disabilities that prevent them from following a standard class curriculum.

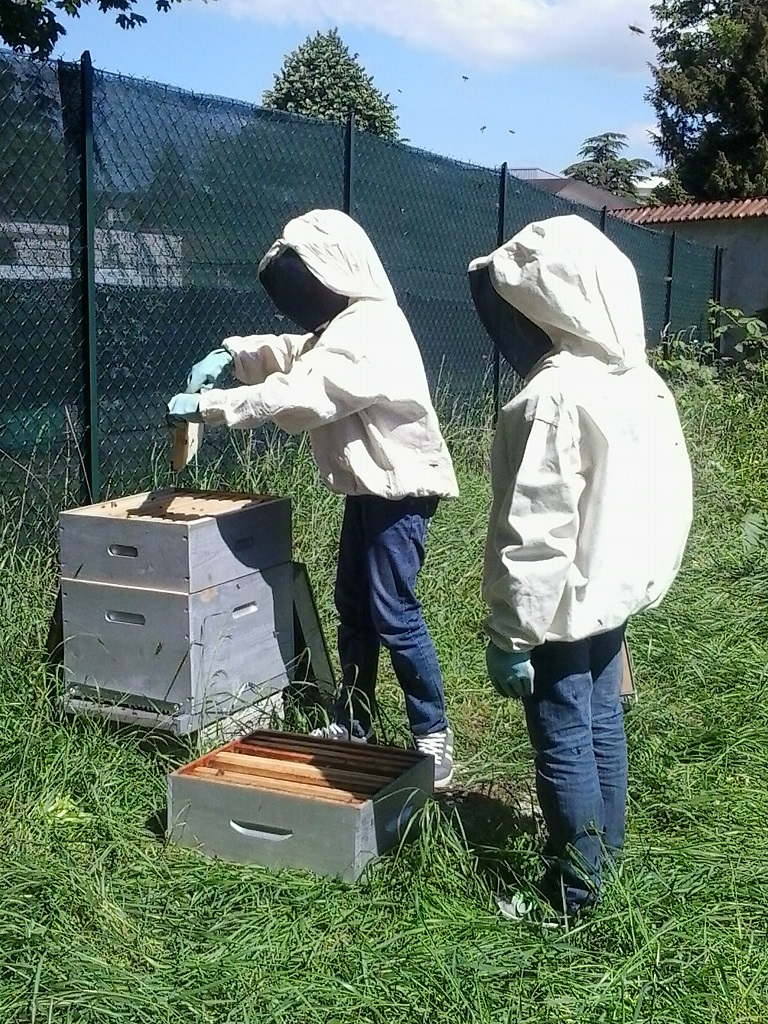
Schoolchildren working on a beehive in the school campus park.

==== Extracurricular and cultural activities at the Middle School ====
Augustin-Thierry Middle School offers various extracurricular activities for interested students.

As part of the National Union of School Sports (UNSS), the school’s sports association offers activities such as table tennis, badminton, swimming, gymnastics, athletics, handball, dance, and French boxing. Some of these activities take place within the school complex, while others occur at different sites in Blois.

During lunchtime, students can also join different clubs: the school newspaper, chess, aeromodelling, circus arts or beekeeping introduction. Participation in a club may lead to public performances, such as those given by amateur circus students who performed at a hospital and a retirement home in 2012. Through the aeromodelling workshop, ninth-grade students can also prepare for the Aeronautics Initiation Certificate, in collaboration with the Breuil airfield.

Lastly, students can take part in a propeller-driven aircraft competition called “Hélitec 41,” organized by the school since 2013 thanks to the initiative of technology teachers Laurence Fameau and Pascal Duménil.

=== International, general, and technological High School ===
==== School curriculum at the international High School ====
Scheme of secondary education in France.

In tenth grade, students at Robert-Badinter High School follow, like all students nationwide, nine core subjects: French; mathematics; history-geography; moral and civic education (EMC); economic and social sciences (SES); life and Earth sciences (SVT); physics-chemistry; digital sciences and technology (SNT); and physical education and sports (EPS). They also continue studying the two foreign languages they began in middle school: LVA (first foreign language) — English, German, or Spanish; and LVB (second foreign language) — German, Spanish, English, or Arabic. Additionally, they receive personalized academic support, particularly for career guidance, academic help, and deepening their knowledge. As an optional course, they may choose a general subject (EPS; Ancient Languages and Cultures — Latin or Greek; LVC Arabic or audiovisual cinema) and/or a technological subject (technological creation and innovation; engineering sciences; or science and laboratory).

From tenth grade through twelfth grade, if students choose the general pathway starting in eleventh grade, they can join a European section (in English, German, or Spanish). This includes one additional hour of foreign language instruction and one hour of history-geography or mathematics taught in the foreign language by a certified teacher. Students may also join the Franco-Spanish binational “Bachibac” section, which strengthens their Spanish (Castilian) proficiency so they can sit for both the French baccalaureate and the Spanish bachillerato at the end of twelfth grade.

Since the high school reform and the abolition of the former L, ES, and S academic tracks, students in eleventh and twelfth grade now all follow the same core curriculum: French (in eleventh grade) then philosophy (in twelfth grade), history-geography, EMC, scientific education (2 hours per week, shared between physics-chemistry and SVT), EPS, LVA, and LVB. They also choose three specialty subjects in eleventh grade, reduced to two in twelfth grade. At Robert-Badinter High School, the available specialties are: History-Geography, Geopolitics and Political Science; Economic and Social Sciences; Humanities, Literature and Philosophy; Mathematics; Physics-Chemistry; Life and Earth Sciences; Engineering Sciences; Digital and Computer Sciences; Foreign Languages, Literature and Cultures (English); Foreign Languages, Literature and Cultures (German); Ancient Languages and Cultures (Latin and Greek). In addition to these, students may choose optional subjects: LVC Arabic, Ancient Languages and Cultures (LCA), or EPS (in eleventh and twelfth grade), as well as complementary or advanced mathematics in twelfth grade.

For students who prefer the technological pathway, Robert-Badinter High School offers Science and Technologies of Industry and Sustainable Development (STI2D) classes starting in eleventh grade. Students in these classes follow common courses in eleventh and twelfth grade: French (in eleventh grade), then philosophy (in twelfth grade), history-geography, EMC, mathematics, EPS, LVA and LVB, and physics-chemistry. In twelfth grade, they also choose a specific focus area (among "Architecture and Construction", "Energy and Environment", "Technological Innovation and Ecodesign", or "Information and Digital Systems"), which replaces the previous “Technological Innovation” and “Engineering and Sustainable Development” subjects.

==== Educational unit for newly arrived non-French-speaking students ====
Robert-Badinter High School has a pedagogical unit for newly arrived allophone students (UPE2A), designed to teach French to young newcomers.

==== Extracurricular and cultural activities at the High School ====
Like the students at the middle school, the high school students of the Robert-Badinter school complex have access to various sports activities within the framework of the UNSS (National Union of School Sports), held on Wednesday afternoons.

Various clubs are also open to high school students, often through the MDL (Maison des Lycéens). The robotics group, which was very active in the school from 2002 to 2008 stood out several times in the E=M6 robotics competition organized by the association Planète Sciences. This interest in mechanics and electronics remains strong in the school today, as shown by the enthusiasm of the "Sustainable Mobility Technology Challenge" (CTMD) club, which won first prize from the Ministry of Education at the 2013 ÉducÉco challenge and third prize in the bicycle category at the Chartres Solar Cup in 2016.

Each year, students and teachers from the high school form one of the reading committees for the Emmanuel-Roblès literary prize. In 2014, one student from the school, Clémentine Bourget, was even named president of the jury.

=== Vocational section (SEP) ===
==== Educational pathway in the SEP ====
Starting in ninth grade (troisième), the vocational section (SEP) of the school complex offers students the opportunity to join the professional discovery option. This section allows students to explore vocational education while also providing them with a pathway toward a Certificate of Professional Aptitude (CAP), a Vocational Studies Certificate (BEP), a vocational baccalaureate, or even a general or technological baccalaureate.

From tenth grade (seconde) through to twelfth grade (terminale), the SEP prepares interested students for one of the following four vocational baccalaureates: Industrial Equipment Maintenance (MEI), Electrical and Connected Environments Trades (MEEC), Industrial Boilermaking Technician (TCI), and Machining Technician (TU). At the post-secondary level, the SEP offers three Higher Technician Certificate (BTS) programs: Industrial Maintenance (MI), Design and Production of Automated Systems (CRSA), and Technical Sales (TC).

Whenever possible, the teaching provided within the SEP is carried out in partnership with companies from the local or regional business networks. When opportunities arise, students are also invited to participate in competitions organized by companies. In 2009, for example, BTS students won first prize in a competition organized by the Christian Dior company.

==== Extracurricular and cultural activities in the SEP ====
Like other students of the school complex, vocational section students can take part in the sports activities offered by the UNSS.

Each year, ninth-grade students in the professional discovery option participate in an interdisciplinary cultural project, such as producing a DVD on surrealism (2012) or on slam poetry (2015 and 2016).

=== School complex ===
Few events bring together all members of the school complex. One such event is the "Musical Recess," which takes place before the Christmas holidays and brings together all students and teachers who wish to share their passion for singing and music. Created in 1996 by a philosophy teacher named Jacques Ziberlin, these "Musical Recess" events saw artists Pierre Simon and Sabine Quinet (founders of the pop-rock duo Minou) give one of their first public performances in 2005, while they were still twelfth-grade students at Augustin-Thierry.

=== GRETA ===
The Robert-Badinter school complex is home to the GRETA of Loir-et-Cher, which offers a wide range of training programs (industry, foreign languages, French, construction and public works, etc.). It also houses the local office of the Academic Scheme for the Validation of Acquired Experience (VAE) and can receive individuals seeking information about this program.

== International outlook ==
=== Bilangual, European, and binational sections ===
Since 2008, the Augustin-Thierry Middle School has offered a bilingual English-German section, which was not eliminated by the "2015 middle school reform."

Several European sections exist at the general and technological high school: a German section (non-language subject in history-geography) since 1997, an English section (non-language subject in history-geography or mathematics) since 1998, and a Spanish section (non-language subject in history-geography) since 2005.

A French-Spanish binational section ("bachibac") has also been available in the general high school since the 2013 school year.

In the 2017 school year, the school complex became the ninth French educational institution to join the “Pasch” program (“Schulen: Partner der Zukunft”), initiated by the German Ministry of Foreign Affairs to promote the learning of German language and culture.

=== Exchanges and trips ===
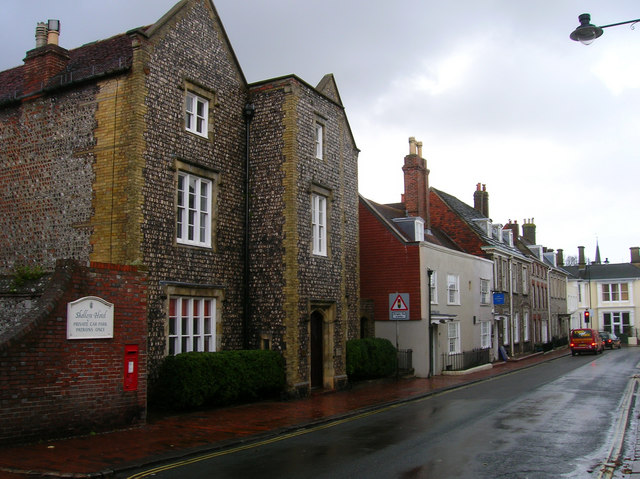
The former Grammar School of Lewes, the first foreign partner of the school complex.

As early as 1946, the lycée established an exchange with the Grammar School (later renamed Priory School) in Lewes, United Kingdom, thanks to the efforts of an English teacher named Robert Piolé. In 1957, another partnership was formed with the Hochrhein Gymnasium in Waldshut, thanks to a former German assistant named Manfred Kirchgässner. After many years, these partnerships came to an end, though not without having previously enabled the town of Blois to establish twinning relationships with the two partner cities of the school complex.

Today, other partnerships exist between the school complex and foreign institutions. The lycée organizes annual exchanges with the Heerenlanden College in Leerdam (Netherlands), the Corvey Gymnasium in Hamburg (Germany), the IES Manuel de Cabanyes in Vilanova i la Geltrú (Spain), and the Suwon Academy of World Languages in Suwon (South Korea). The collège, for its part, mainly organizes school trips abroad (to Munich and Barcelona, in particular).

Finally, thanks to a donation from a wealthy New Zealand benefactor, Mr. Raymond Nutter, an exchange has linked the lycée to Thames High School since 1988. Each year, two students from the first year of the general track are selected to spend the months of July and August at their exchange partner’s school. In return, they host a New Zealand student in December–January.

=== Foreign language assistants ===
Since 1945, many assistants from around the world (Germany and Austria; the Commonwealth and the United States; Spain and Latin America; the Arab world) have spent a year at the school complex. For a long time, these young people were provided with room and board on-site (first in the Tilleul building, then in building J), but this practice declined during 1990. Over the years, several of these assistants left a lasting impression on the school. This is particularly true of the German Manfred Kirchgässner, who initiated the twinning between Blois and Waldshut-Tiengen (1963), but also of Mr. Blackmore, whose research led to the listing of the Hugo and Lunier buildings in the General Inventory of Cultural Heritage.

== Enrollment figures ==
=== Student population ===
After peaking at nearly 2,500 students in the late 1980s, the school complex’s enrollment has steadily declined, as shown in the following table:

Changes in secondary school enrolment (start of academic years 2004 to 2011 and then 2014)
| | 2004 | 2005 | 2006 | 2007 | 2008 | 2009 | 2010 | 2011 | 2014 |
| Middle school | 613 | 608 | 592 | 596 | 603 | 584 | 577 | 556 | 571 |
| Comprehensive high school | 1286 | 1274 | 1273 | 1213 | 1175 | 1097 | 1076 | 1043 | 974 |
| Total | 1899 | 1882 | 1865 | 1809 | 1778 | 1681 | 1653 | 1599 | 1545 (+ 83 BTS) |

As of the 2024 school year, there are 720 students in the collège and 996 in the lycée (739 in the general and technological lycée, and 257 in the vocational section), for a total of 1,716 adolescents. Additionally, there are 147 BTS students. (Note: Figures kindly provided by the school complex's secretariat.)

=== Teaching and non-teaching staff ===
As of the 2010 school year, the school complex employs 325.5 staff members. In addition to 216 teachers and 3 teacher-librarians, the educational team includes 4 school administrators, 4 senior education advisors, 3 national education psychologists (PsyEN), 16.5 education assistants, and 4 foreign assistants. They are supported by 3 nurses, 1 social worker, 14 administrative staff members, and 58 workers and maintenance personnel.

== Exam results ==
Based on statistics from the Ministry of National Education, L'Étudiantmagazine reported in 2016 a success rate of 84% on the 2015 Diplôme National du Brevet (with 53% earning honors) for students at Collège Augustin-Thierry. This is slightly below the national average, which stood at 87% success and 58.4% with honors. As a result, the magazine gave the school a score of 13.7/20, ranking it sixth out of nine public and private collèges in Blois.

Evolution of results in the national certificate (DNB) since 2012
| | 2012 | 2013 | 2014 | 2015 | 2016 |
| Success rate (marks) | 86.96% (56.52%) | 80.15% (49.26%) | 80.13% (47.44%) | 84% (53%) | |

In 2017, the newspaper La Nouvelle République ranked the general and technological lycée sixth out of nine public and private institutions in the Loir-et-Cher department, and second out of four public schools in Blois. That same year, L'Étudiant gave the school a score of 14.2/20, classifying it as an “average lycée,” according to the magazine.

Evolution of general and technological baccalaureate results since 2008
| | 2008 | 2009 | 2010 | 2011 | 2012 | 2013 | 2014 | 2015 | 2016 |
| Success rate in L (national added value) | 89% (-5) | 71% (-20) | 64% (-22) | 83% (-7) | 74% (-12) | 88% (-4) | 92% (+6) | 70% (-23) | 95% (+4) |
| Success rate in vocational education (national added value) | 88% (-2) | 92% (-1) | 85% (-8) | 85% (-3) | 84% (-9) | 92% (-2) | 89% (-3) | 83% (-10) | 89% (-4) |
| Success rate in S (national added value) | 89% (-6) | 94% (0) | 86% (-8) | 88% (-3) | 88% (-5) | 79% (-16) | 87% (-7) | 91% (-1) | 91% (-3) |
| Success rate in STI / STI2D (national added value) | 87% (+6) | 80% (-4) | 79% (-1) | 72% (-6) | 84% (-4) | 81% (-13) | 88% (-7) | 89% (-7) | 92% (-1) |
| Success rate all series (national added value) | 88% (-2) | 88% (-3) | 81% (-8) | 84% (-4) | 84% (-7) | 83% (-11) | 88% (-4) | 86% (-7) | 91% (-3) |

At the same time, La Nouvelle République ranked the vocational lycée eighth out of eight public and private institutions in Loir-et-Cher in 2017. That same year, L'Étudiant gave it a score of 12.2/20, which also classified it as an “average lycée” (whereas it had been considered a “good lycée” in 2015).

Trend in vocational baccalaureate results since 2008
| | 2008 | 2009 | 2010 | 2011 | 2012 | 2013 | 2014 | 2015 | 2016 |
| Success rate in Production (national added value) | 73% (-4) | 77% (-9) | 62% (-27) | 80% (+1) | 78% (+5) | 87% (+8) | 80% (+3) | 77% (-4) | 72% (-7) |

Finally, in 2015, L'Étudiant reported a success rate of 91% in the BTS Design and Production of Automated Systems program, 78% in the BTS Industrial Maintenance program, and 92% in the BTS Technical Sales program.

== Notable figures associated with the school complex ==
=== Former students ===
The Friendly Association of Former Students of the Collège and Lycée Augustin-Thierry is one of the oldest in France: it has existed since 1872, preceding by a few months the renaming of the Blois college to Collège Augustin-Thierry. The first general assembly of the Association took place on August 10, 1872: it adopted its statutes and appointed Senator Amédée Thierry and General Juste-Frédéric Riffault as honorary presidents. Two days later, the Association met again and elected Louis de La Saussaye as president.

Since then, the Association’s mission has been to promote the influence of the school complex and to demonstrate its moral, and even financial, support for the school’s students. Its current president is Mr. Christian Prieur.

List of presidents of the Alumni Association
| Presidency Dates | Identity | Biographical Notes |
|---|---|---|
| 1872 | Amédée Thierry (1797-1873) - Juste-Frédéric Riffault (1814-1885) | Historian, prefect, senator, and member of the Institute – General, Director of the École Polytechnique |
| 1872 | Louis de La Saussaye (1801-1878) | Rector of the Academy of Lyon, archaeologist, and member of the Institute |
| | Théodore Boulland | Professor at the Augustin-Thierry College |
| | Reber | Professor at the Augustin-Thierry College |
| | Alcide Chapuy | Pharmacist in Blois |
| | Édouard Blau (1836-1906) | Librettist and playwright |
| | Maxime Blanchon | Banker in Blois |
| | Eugène Macé (1831-1914) | Brigadier general of artillery in Blois |
| | Jules Burat | Tax collector in Blois |
| | Louis Belton (1846-1928) | Lawyer in Blois and local historian |
| | Charles Mine | Senior road surveyor |
| | Hubert-Fillay (1879-1945) | Lawyer and regionalist writer |
| | Frédéric Lesueur (1877-1971) | Doctor, curator of the Château de Blois, and local historian |
| | Émile Couteau (1837-1930) | Lawyer at the Paris Court of Appeal |
| | Louis Quillot | Tax collector and director of the Blois Savings Bank |
| | A. Bartholin | Pharmaceutical industry manufacturer in Ménars |
| | Christian Guéritte | Son of the mayor of Blois, Jules Guéritte, and manufacturer in Blois |
| | Abel Sommereau | Public works engineer in Blois |
| | André Grenouillot (1883-1970) | Historical Monuments architect in Paris |
| | Jean-Louis André | Entrepreneur, member of the Economic Council in Blois |
| | Jean Mornet | Doctor, intern at the Paris Hospitals |
| | Jean Collin | Dental surgeon in Blois |
| 1957-1959 | Charles Fichepain | General in Blois |
| 1959-1963 | Clovis Guerin | Chief tax collector (PTT) in Blois |
| 1963-1964 | Roger Fouilloux | Notary in Blois |
| 1964-1967 | Robert Piolé (d. 1966) | English teacher at Augustin-Thierry High School |
| 1967-1968 | Robert Touchard | Central inspector of direct taxes in Blois |
| 1968-1972 | Henri Vezin | Doctor in Blois |
| 1972-1977 | Jacques Berthonneau | General Director of La Franciade in Blois |
| 1977-1980 | Roger Vincendeau | Head of the Telecommunications Center in Blois |
| 1980-1984 | Robert Pichererau | Telecommunications Director in Blois |
| 1984-1987 | Jean-François Doré (d. 2007) | Art photographer in Blois |
| 1987-1989 | Francis Cortambert | Veterinarian in Blois |
| 1989-1992 | Guy Perseval | Hospital executive in Blois |
| 1992-1998 | Jean Housset | Chief engineer at the SNCF in Paris |
| 1998-2000 | Michel Mettaie | Physical Education teacher at Augustin-Thierry High School |
| 2000-2021 | Christian Prieur | Executive at the Blois Post Office |
| Since 2021 | Jean-Marie Sadowniczyk (b. 1955) | Professor of physics and electronics at the IUT of Blois |

Many students who sat in the classrooms of the Blois college and the current school complex have left their mark on the history of the Blois region and France. Among them are:

- Some students of the Royal College:
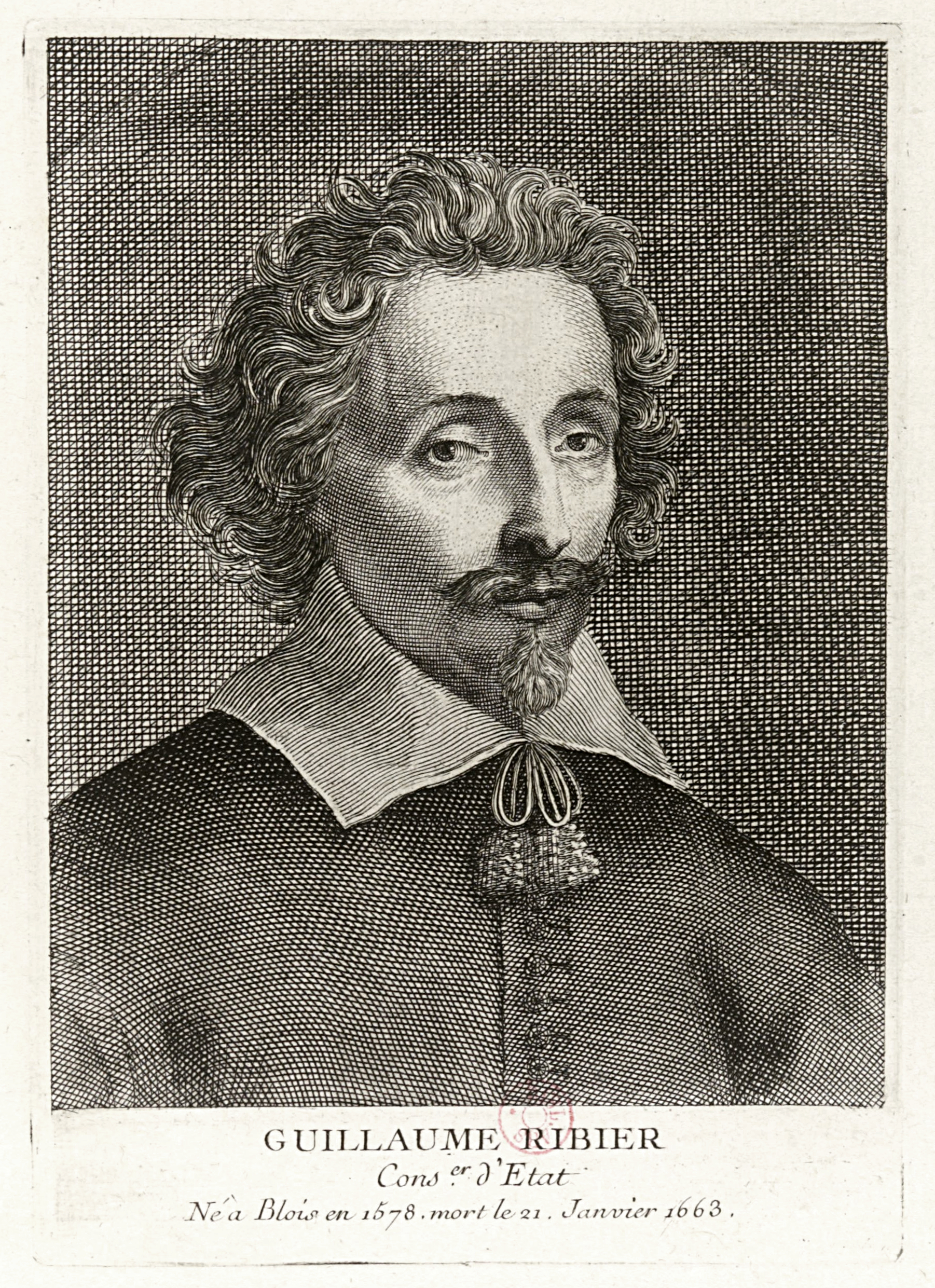
Guillaume Ribier (1578-1663), member of the States General.

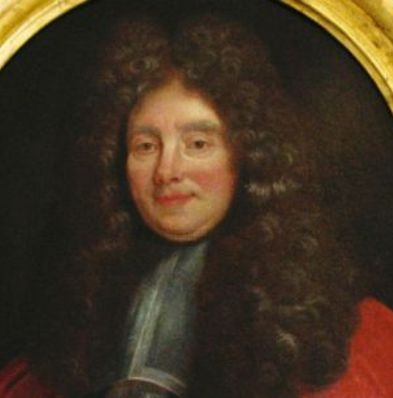
Michel Bégon (1638-1710), naval and colonial administrator.

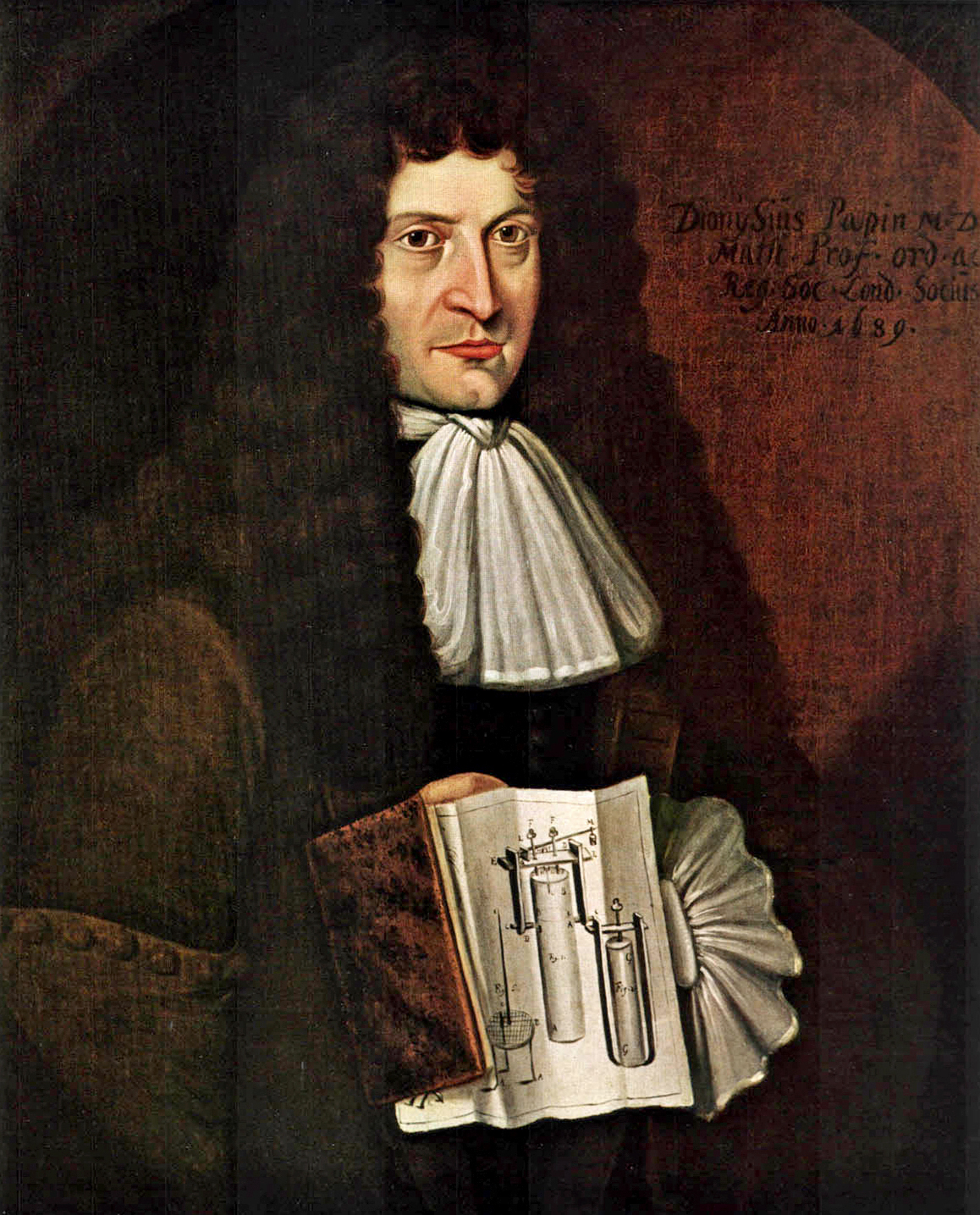
Denis Papin (1647-1712), physicist and mathematician.

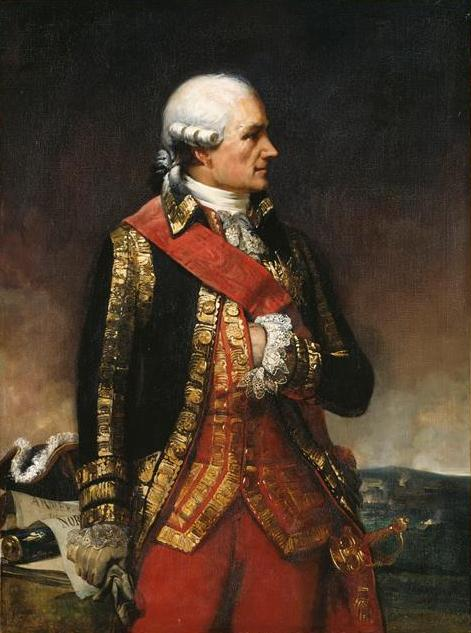
Marshal de Rochambeau (1725-1807), a combatant in the American War of Independence.

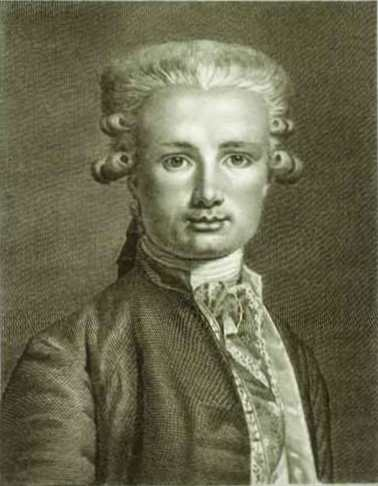
Ange-François Fariau de Saint-Ange (1747-1810), poet and translator.
- Some students of the Collège du Bourg-Moyen:
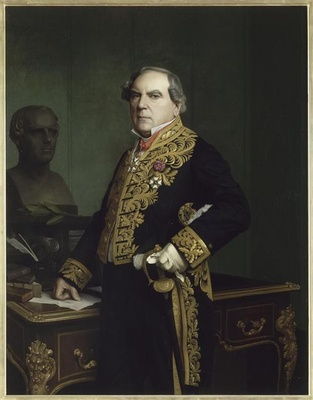
Amédée Thierry (1797-1973), historian and senator.

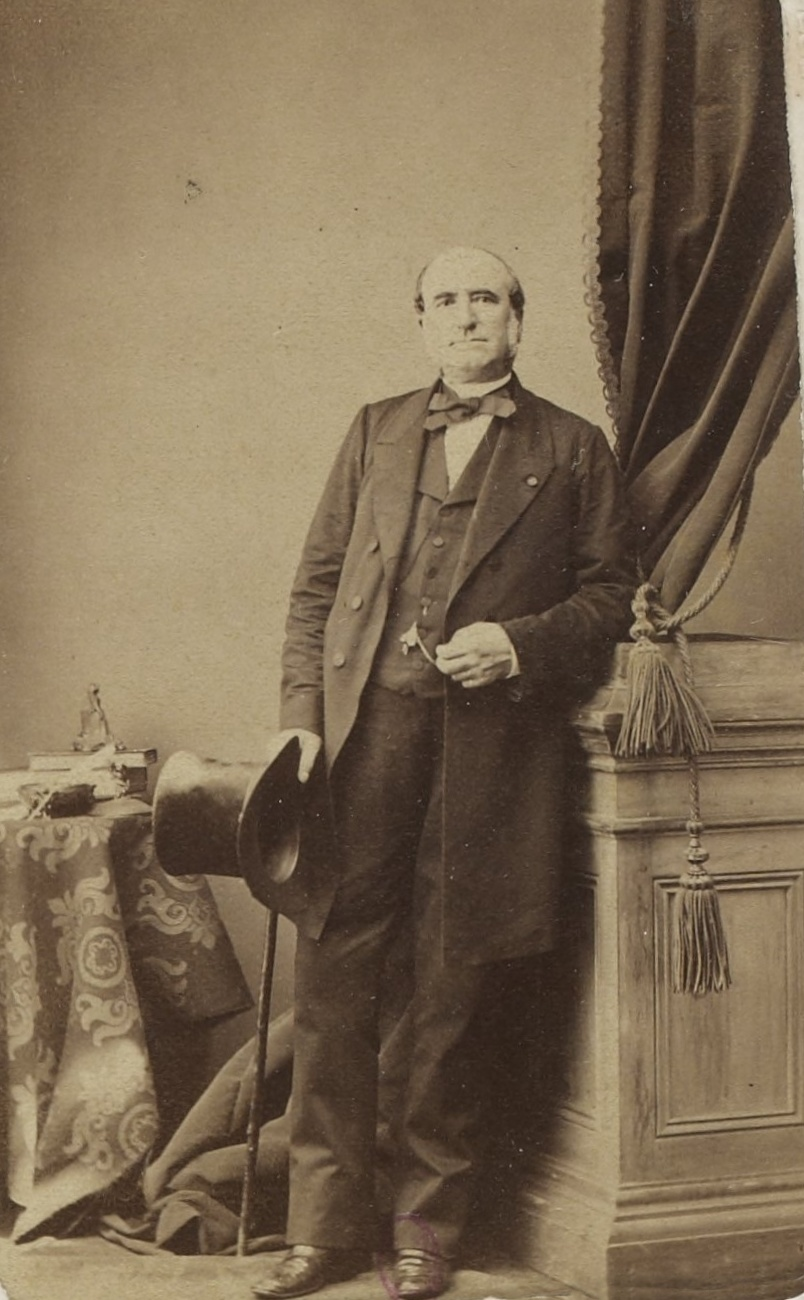
Louis de La Saussaye (1801-1878), scholar and rector of the academy.

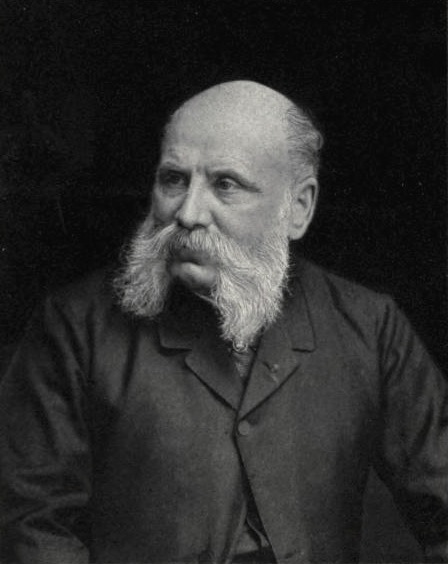
Armand Baschet (1829-1886), journalist and polemicist.

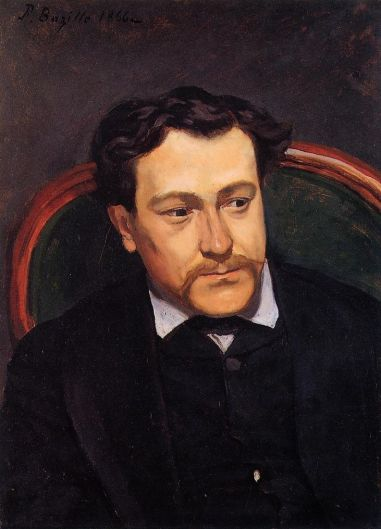
Édouard Blau (1836-1906), librettist.

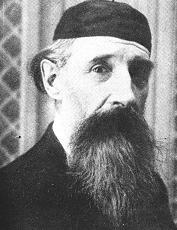
Pascal Forthuny (1872-1962), medium.

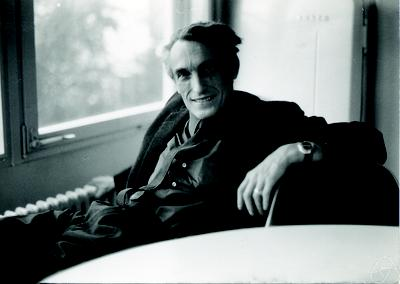
Marcel-Paul Schützenberger (1920-1996), mathematician and computer scientist.
- Some students of the current school complex:
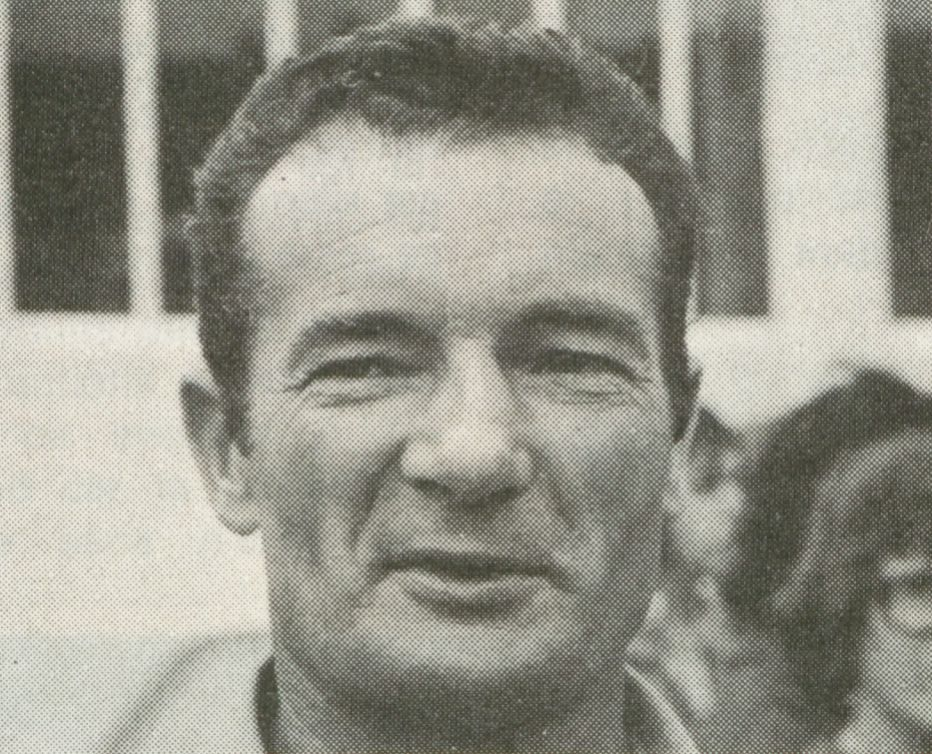
Éric Tabarly (1931), sailor.

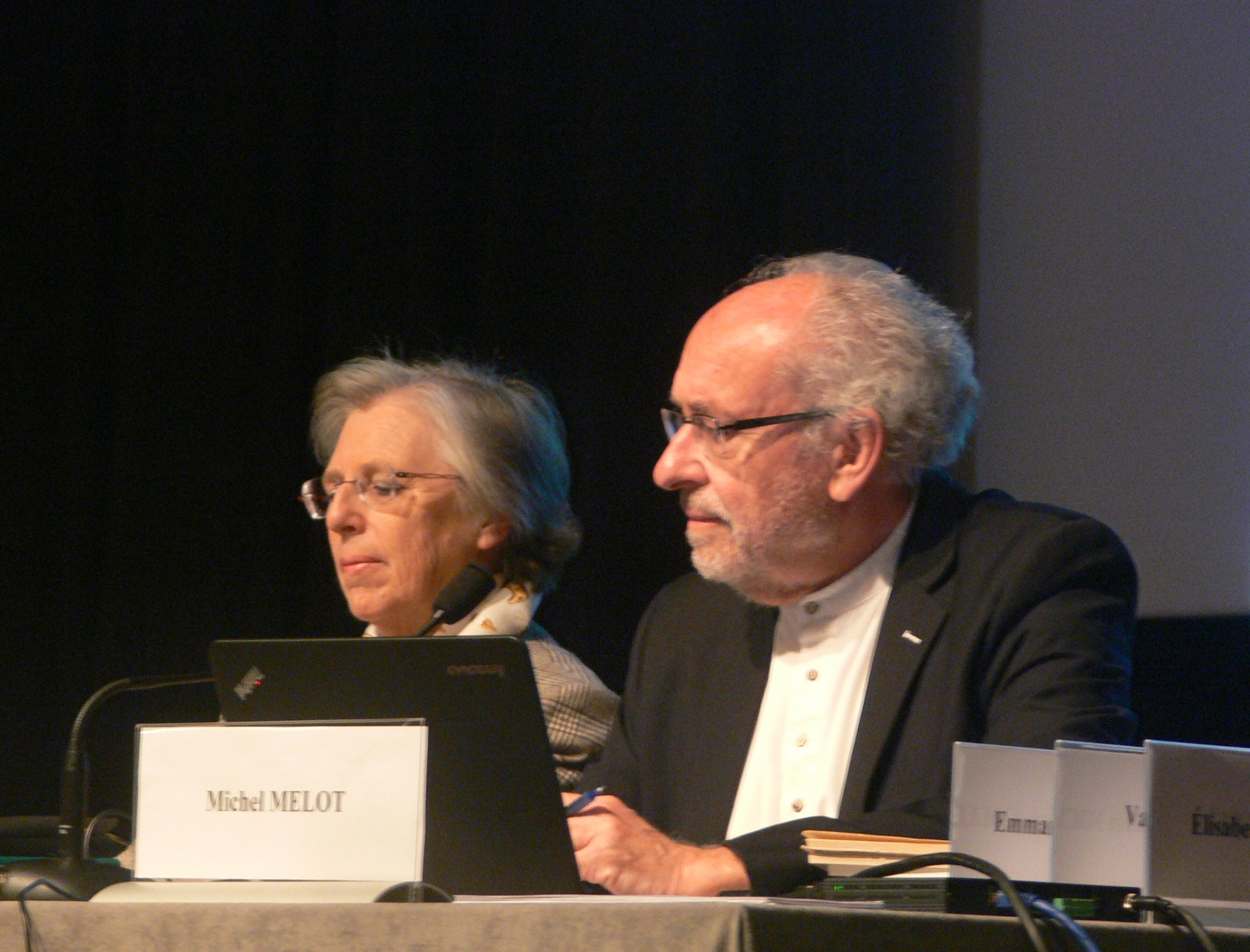
Michel Melot (1943), curator and historian.

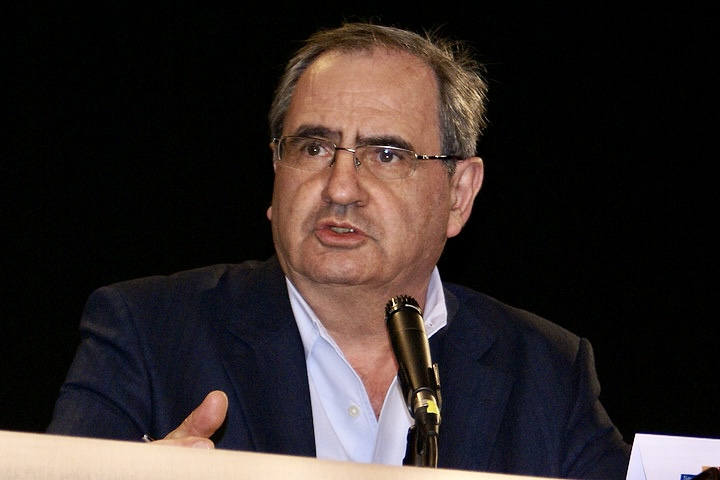
Pierre Rosanvallon (1948), historian and sociologist.

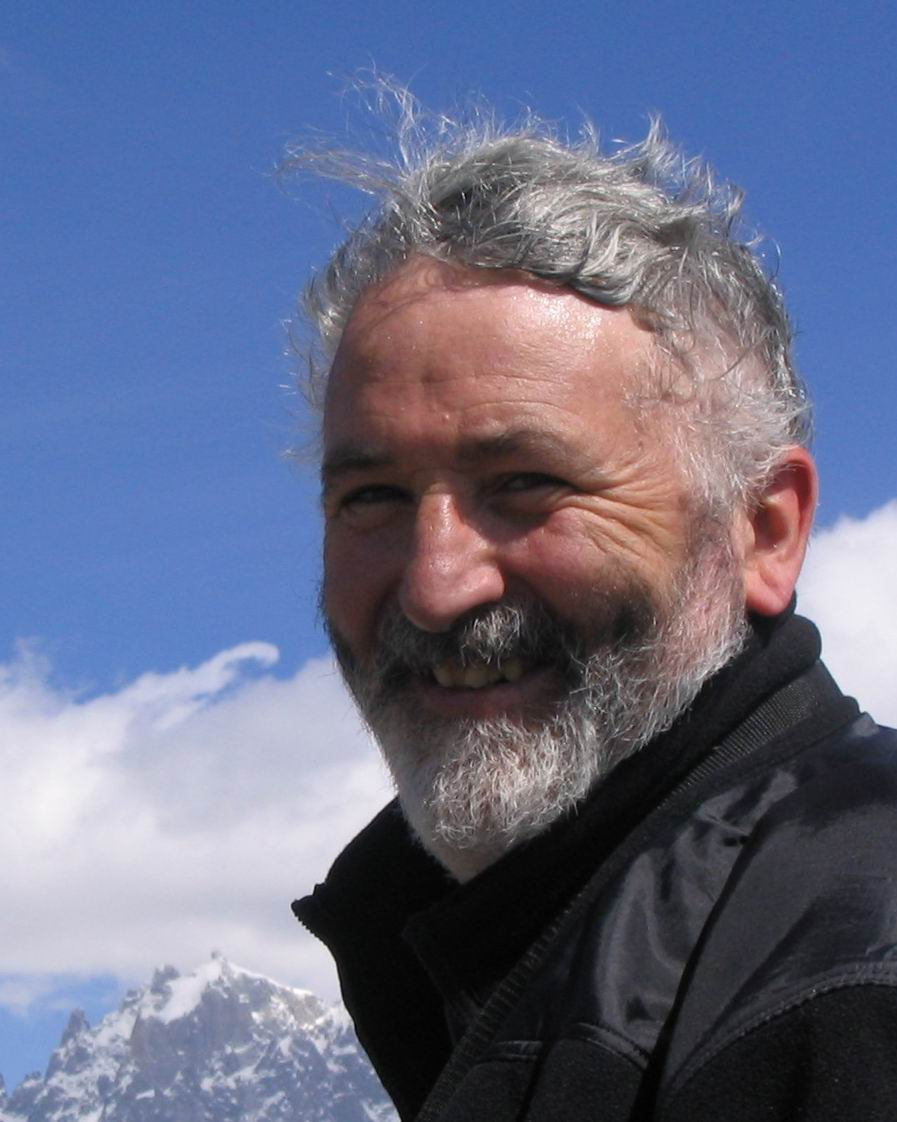
Philippe Barbeau (1952), children's writer.

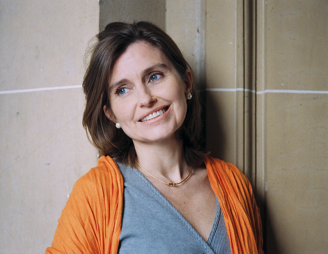
Florence Noiville (1961), journalist and writer.

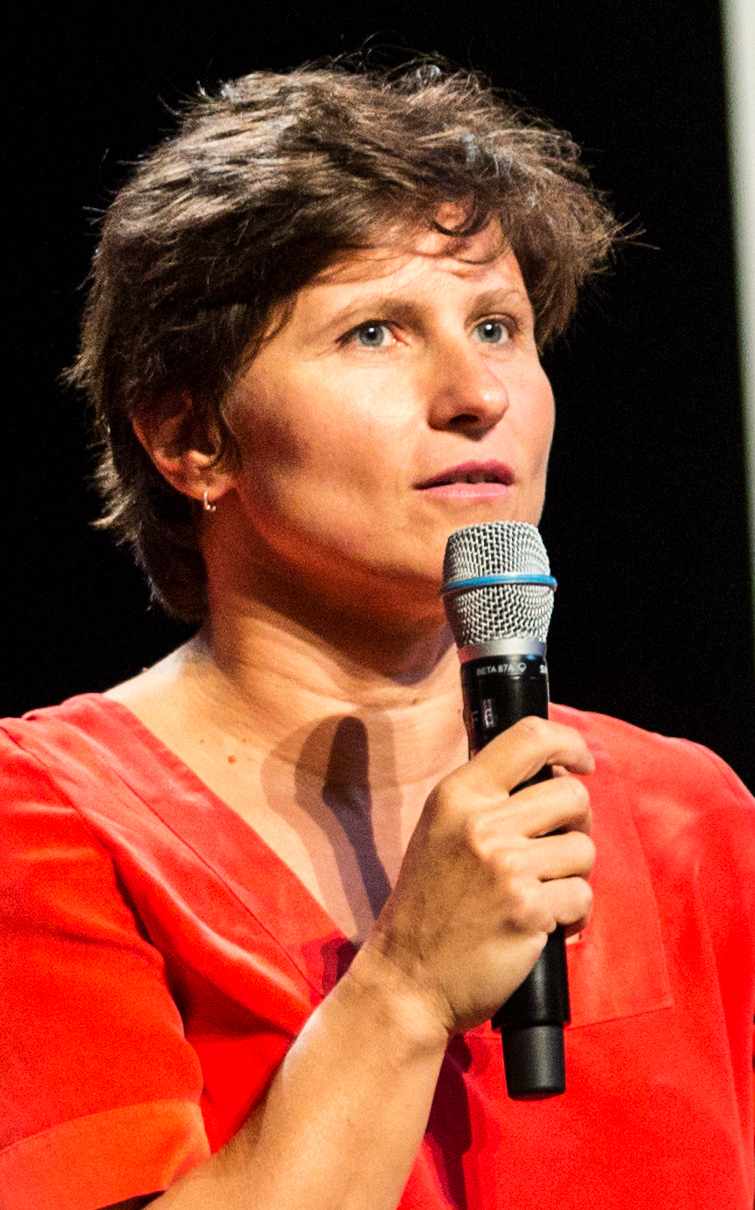
Roxana Maracineanu (1975), swimmer and minister.

=== Former teachers and administrative staff ===
Principals of the Royal College of Blois (1587–1622)
| Date of Appointment | Date of Departure | Name of Principal | Dates of Life | Biographical Notes |
|---|---|---|---|---|
| 1587 | 1605 | Jean Housset (or Gousset) | | He was opposed for several years by a man named Jean Le Tellier for the title of “Master of the Great Schools of the City of Blois.” |
| 1605 | 1609 | Jacques Vallet | | |
| 1609 | 1622 | Jean Dufour | | Author of Horatius Christianus (1629). |

Rectors of the Jesuit College of Blois (1622–1762)
| Date of Appointment | Date of Departure | Name of Principal | Dates of Life | Biographical Notes |
|---|---|---|---|---|
| 1623 | 1632 | Aignan Moreau | Born in 1571 | |
| 1632 | 1636 | Jérôme Lalemant | 1593-1673 | Missionary in New France (1638–1673) |
| 1637 | 1641 | Charles Paulin | 1593-1653 | Confessor to the young Louis XIV (1649–1653) |
| 1651 or 1652 | 1654 | Jean de Brisacier | 1603-1668 | Famous for his fight against Jansenism; also served as Visitor in Portugal |
| 1654 | 1660 | Lecointre | | |
| 1660 | 1663 | Pierre de Villongues | | |
| 1663 | 1664 | Pierre Martin | | |
| 1664 | 1677 | Jean Foyard | | |
| 1677 | 1687 | Cadeau | | |
| 1687 | 1700 | François Voisin | | |
| 1700 | 1705 | Robert Riquez | | |
| 1705 | 1707 | Jean Vanhrin or Van-Rhyn | | |
| 1707 | 1709 | Jean Paillot | 1654-1709 | Author of plays |
| 1709 | 1727 | André Le Camus | 1663-1740 | Author of plays for the Paris college |
| 1727 | 1740 | Gilbert Petit | d. 1740 | Missionary in India |
| 1740 | 1746 | Joseph Duprais | | |
| 1746 | 1750 | Jean Pichon | 1683-1751 | Author, Vicar General and general visitor of the Diocese of Sion, in Switzerland |
| 1750 | 1753 | Joseph d'Anthoyner | | |
| 1753 | 1756 | Nicolas-Ignace Coiffier | | |
| 1756 | 1760 | Étienne de Bonneuil | | |
| 1760 | 1762 | Louis Nepveu | | |

Principals of the Royal College of Blois (1762–1792)
| Date of Appointment | Date of Departure | Name of Principal | Dates of Life | Biographical Notes |
|---|---|---|---|---|
| 1764 | 1767 | François-Marie Labady | | Dean of the Faculty of Law at Poitiers between 1789 and 1791 |
| 1767 | 1769 | Philis de Jessin or Gessin | | |
| 1769 | 1791 | Jean Boutault | 1738-1836 | Non-juring priest; arrested and sentenced to death during the Revolution. He escaped the guillotine and later became mayor of Vineuil in 1805 |

Principals of the Communal College of Blois (1804–1872)
| Date of Appointment | Date of Departure | Name of Principal | Dates of Life | Biographical Notes |
|---|---|---|---|---|
| 1802-1804 | 1814 | Claude Giraudeau Delanoue (or de Lanoue) | Born in 1767 | He was head of the college of Blois when the young Augustin Thierry studied there. He was also made a Knight of the Legion of Honor in 1814. |
| | | Chevalier de Fontenay | | Former officer in the army of the Princes; he was made a Knight of Saint Louis. |
| 1822 | 1832 | Louis Godeau (or Gaudeau) | | Author of Leçons synchroniques d'histoire générale, he ended his career as librarian of Blois. |
| | 1835 or 1836 | Tremblaire or Temblaire | | |
| 1835 or 1836 | 1849 | Alexandre Béon | | |
| 1849 | 1866 | Vidal | | |
| 1866 | 1866 | Édouard Bloume | 1815-1866 | |
| 1866 | 1869 | Monier | | |
| 1869 | 1871 | Alfred Tronche | Died in 1876 | During the Franco-Prussian War, he distinguished himself through the care he gave to wounded soldiers. He was also an Officier d'Académie. |
| 1871 | 1873 | Profillet | | |

Principals of the Communal College Augustin-Thierry of Blois (1872–1946)
| Date of Appointment | Date of Departure | Name of Principal | Dates of Life | Biographical Notes |
|---|---|---|---|---|
| 1871 | 1873 | Profillet | | Appointed Officier d’Académie in 1872. |
| 1873 | 1876 | Chrétien | | |
| 1876 | 1877 | J. Verlac | | |
| 1877 | 1881 | Lagoguey | | |
| 1881 | 1886 | Pierre Denat (or Dénat) | | |
| 1886 | 1886 | Duval | | |
| 1886 | 1893 | Burnouf | | |
| 1893 | 1895 | Jean-Baptiste Créances | Born in 1845 | |
| 1895 | 1902 | Bouvart | | |
| [1902] | [1902] | Brepsant | | Appointed to Blois, he declined the post and preferred to remain principal of the college in Meaux. |
| 1902 | 1907 | Pierre-Léon Boucheron | | |
| 1907 | 1910 | Lenègre | | |
| 1910 | 1917 | Henri Abadie | | |
| 1917 | 1928 | Louis-Hippolyte (or Eugène?) Jossinet | Born in 1887 | Decorated with the Legion of Honor around 1920. |
| 1928 | c. 1937 | Georges Hasdenteufel | | Knight of the Légion d'honneur in 1937. |
| | 1944 | Chardon | | Involved in the Resistance, he was arrested on May 20, 1944, and deported to Dachau on June 18. Due to his strong constitution, he survived the camp experience. |
| 1944 | | Mascart | | Served as interim principal after the arrest of Principal Chardon. |
| | 1946 | Bonnet | | |

Head Principals of the Augustin-Thierry General and Technical High School of Blois (since 1946)
| Date of Appointment | Date of Departure | Name of Principal | Dates of Life | Biographical Notes |
|---|---|---|---|---|
| 1946 | 1954 | Sylvain Broussaudier | 1904-1980 | Socialist and pacifist activist |
| 1954 | 1957 | Maurice (?) Tison (or Tizon) | | |
| | 1973 | Charles (?) Riebert (or Ribert) | | |
| 1973 | 1978 | Pierre Morbois | 1922-2015 | Knight of the Ordre national du Mérite and Officer of the Palmes académiques. |
| 1978 | 1994 | Michel Dansart | | Knight of the Légion d’honneur (2001). |
| 1994 | 1998 | Pascal Monsellier | | |
| 1998 | 2005 | René Bayssière | | Author of several articles (notably in Le Monde diplomatique), and former cultural attaché at the French Embassy in Cambodia (1996–1998). |
| 2005 | 2008 | Hugues Sollin | Born in 1954 | |
| 2008 | 2010 | Jean-Marie Deroubaix | Born in 1950 | |
| 2010 | 2011 | Jean-Claude Denaix | | |
| 2011 | 2013 | Éric Gommé | Born in 1962 | |
| 2013 | 2016 | Marc Lueger | | |
| 2016 | 2019 | Évelyne Azihari | Born in 1957 | 9th Vice-President (in charge of sustainable development) of the Communauté d’agglomération du pays châtelleraudais. |
| 2019 | 2019 | Michel Chesne | Born in 1961 | Former principal of the French High School in Copenhagen. Due to health issues, he was replaced starting in January 2020 by Jérôme Lauxire, principal of Lycée Dessaignes., |
| 2020 | 2024 | Jérôme Lauxire | | He remained head of the school when it became an international high school. |

Head Principals of the Robert-Badinter International High School of Blois (since 2025)
| Date of Appointment | Date of Departure | Name of Principal | Dates of Life | Biographical Notes |
|---|---|---|---|---|
| Since 2025 | | Jérôme Lauxire | | Officer of the Palmes académiques. |

Several staff members from the former Royal College, the Collège du Bourg-Moyen, and the current school complex have also left their imprint on history. Among them are:

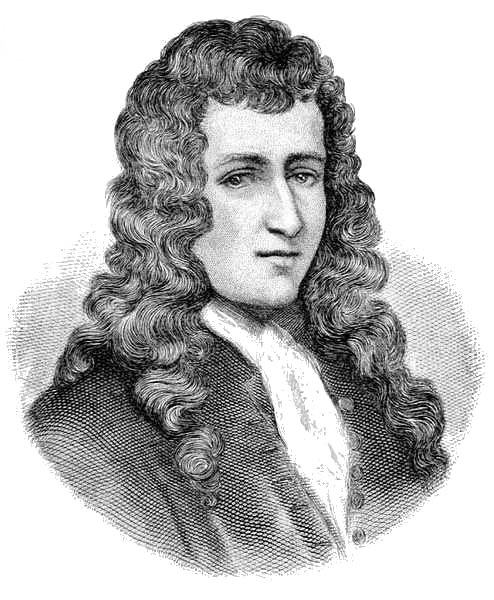
The explorer René-Robert Cavelier de La Salle (1643-1687), teacher of fifth year.

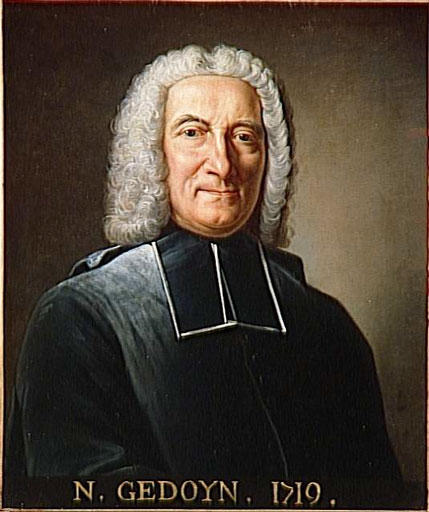
The academician Nicolas Gédoyn (1677-1744), teacher of rhetoric.

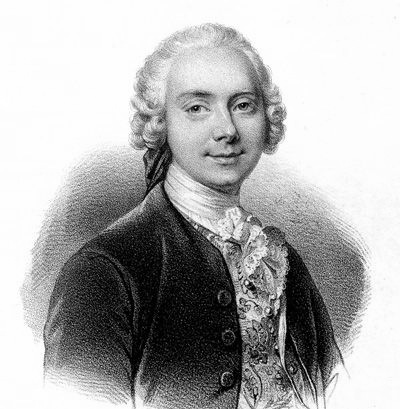
The poet Jean-Baptiste Gresset (1709-1777), teacher of rhetoric.

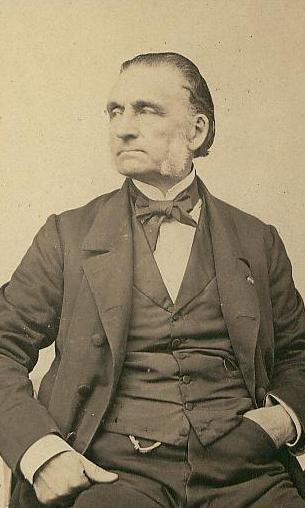
The doctor Armand Trousseau (1801-1867), tutor.

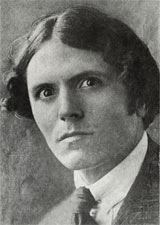
The anarchist activist André Colomer (1886-1931), teacher.

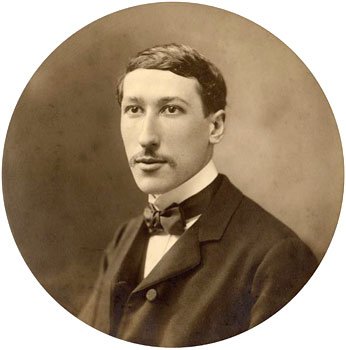
The esotericist René Guénon (1886-1951), former student and professor of philosophy.

== The school complex in culture ==
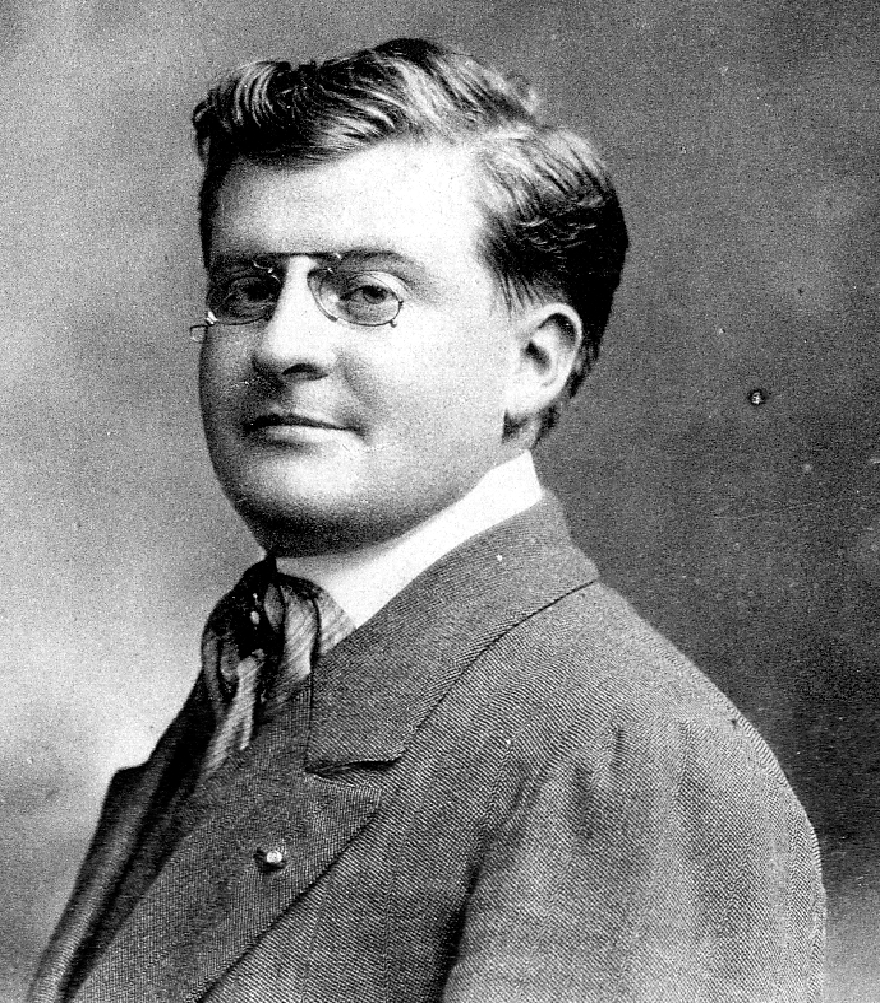
The regionalist writer Hubert-Fillay (1879-1945), author of memoirs related to the former college.

Several authors have mentioned the collège and lycée in their works.

This is the case for historian Augustin Thierry himself, who recounts in the Récits des temps mérovingiens (1840) how, in 1810, he devoured Les Martyrs by Chateaubriand in the Bourg-Moyen buildings. The reading of this work affected him so deeply that he could not refrain from declaiming lines from it (“Pharamond! Pharamond! We fought with the sword!”) in the school's chapter room. This work by Chateaubriand went on to inspire him constantly and profoundly influenced him through the Romantic movement.

The former college also appears in the works of regionalist writer Hubert-Fillay. He nostalgically describes his teenage years at the collège in Jeunesse !… Souvenirs blésois (1934). The author also recounts, in La Grand'pitié de la ville de Blois (1940), the destruction of the institution and the ruins that followed.

Jean-François Hauduroy briefly mentions life at the Blois collège during World War II in his novel Véra (1989).

Children’s literature author Philippe Barbeau frequently features the lycée on Avenue de Châteaudun and the teachers (such as Mr. Duclos, Mr. Dimanche, or Mr. Carbonel) who left a lasting impression on him during his teenage years in the 1960s. This is especially true in his autobiographical novel Je lui ai promis (The Promise) from 2013, and in the memoir “De voix en aiguille” included in the collection A Childhood Love in 2007. More anecdotally, the writer also refers, in 2009, to the old collège on Rue du Bourg-Moyen and its last principal (Mr. Chardon) in the novel June 1940: Fear on the Road.

On Television, the premises of the school complex served as a set for the educational sitcom Les Zèbres, directed by Gilles Bannier and Stéphane Moszkowicz in 1997–1998. (Note: See the credits of the series, which notably thank “Mr. MONSELLIER (principal), Ms. PICORNELL (assistant principal), as well as all the staff and students of Lycée AUGUSTIN-THIERRY.”)

The current lycée is featured in several works, including Jean-Marc Charpentier’s autobiography Le Fil à linge (2013), which mentions a physics teacher who instilled “sheer terror” in him. Sociologist Pierre Rosanvallon, the teacher’s son, also recalls the institution in Notre Histoire intellectuelle et politique, 1968-2018 (2018).

== Bibliography ==
=== History of the school complex and its heritage ===
- Cosperec, Annie (1997). "L'Actuel Lycée Augustin-Thierry : le prieuré et la villa Saint-Lazare, l'hospice Lunier" [L'Actuel Lycée Augustin-Thierry: the priory and the villa Saint-Lazare, the Lunier hospice]. Mélanges offerts à Claude Leymarios (in French): 71–77.
- Denis, Jean-Yves (1986). Le Collège : Le Lycée Augustin-Thierry : Grande et petite histoire [The College: The Augustin-Thierry High School: History and more] (in French). Blois: Association of former students of the Augustin-Thierry secondary school. ASIN B007JKQO86.
- Martin-Demézil, Jean (1945). "Arts et Lettres" [Arts and Literature]. Le Jardin de la France (in French) (305, 306 & 307).

=== General works on the institution and its heritage ===
- Denis, Yves (1988). Histoire de Blois et de sa région [History of Blois and the surrounding region] (in French). Privat. ASIN B007X19URS.
- Guignard, Bruno (2007). "Aliénés" [Insane]. Blois de A à Z [Blois from A to Z] (in French). Éditions Alan Sutton. pp. 7–12. ISBN 978-2849106211.
- Nourrisson, Pascal (2005). Blois : Le dictionnaire des noms de rues [Blois: The street directory] (in French). Chambray-lès-Tours: C.L.D. éditions. ISBN 2-85443-433-1.

=== Literary evocations of the Bourg-Moyen secondary school and the current school complex ===
- Barbeau, Philippe (2004). "Histoire de rencontres" [History of meetings]. Griffon (in French) (194): 2–13. ISSN 0299-7827.
- Barbeau, Philippe (2007). "De voix en aiguille" [One voice after another]. Un Amour d'enfance [A childhood love] (in French). Bayard. pp. 66–68. ISBN 978-2-7470-2438-9.
- Barbeau, Philippe (2013). Je lui ai promis [I promised him] (in French). Paris: Oskar. ISBN 979-10-214-0094-8.
- Fillay, Hubert (1934). Jeunesse !… : Souvenirs blésois [Youth! ...: Memories of Blésois] (in French). Éditions du Jardin de la France. ASIN B00183TJBE.
- Fillay, Hubert (1940). La Grand'pitié de la ville de Blois [La Grand'pitié in the city of Blois] (in French). Éditions du Jardin de la France. OCLC 493791568.
- Thierry, Augustin (1840). "Préface" [Preface]. Récits des temps mérovingiens [Stories of Merovingian times] (in French). Paris: Tessier. pp. 21–24.
