= Priory of Saint Lazarus and Lunier hospice =

Former leper hospital, priory, villa and hospice complex in Blois, France

Leper hospital, later priory and then Saint-Lazare Villa – Lunier Villa and Hospice
- Hugo and Lunier Buildings of the Robert-Badinter School Complex
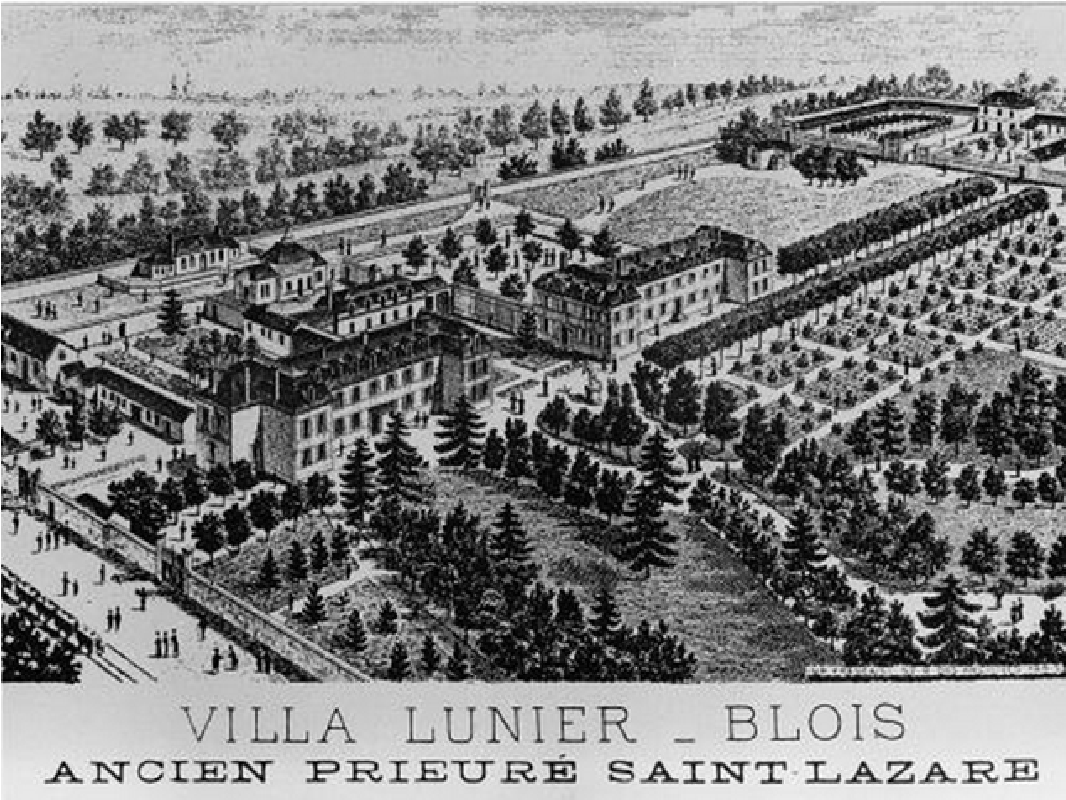
- The Lunier Villa at the end of the 19th century, engraving by L. Doutrebente.
- Interactive map of Leper hospital, later priory and then Saint-Lazare Villa – Lunier Villa and Hospice
- Coordinates: 47.5976429°N 1.3300551°E, Neoclassical architecture and Neo-Renaissance style

The Saint-Lazare leper hospital, later transformed into a priory, then a castle or Saint-Lazare Villa, and finally the Lunier Hospice, is a complex of buildings listed in the General Inventory of Cultural Heritage and now incorporated into the Robert-Badinter School Complex in Blois, Loir-et-Cher, France.

Founded between 1116 and 1126 by Count Theobald IV of Blois and Geoffroy of Lèves, Bishop of Chartres, the Saint-Lazare leper hospital was originally intended for the isolation of people suffering from leprosy. Following the disappearance of the disease, the institution became, in the 16th century, a priory belonging to the Congregation of France (the Génovéfains). Rebuilt and altered in the 18th century, the priory was confiscated as national property in 1791 before being sold two years later to Nicolas Chambon de Montaux, mayor of Paris.

Subsequently transferred to several owners, including the father of Victor Hugo, the priory ultimately passed to a financier named Jean-Simon Chambert-Péan in 1834. He then erected a villa (or château) on the site of the former monastery and planted the estate with numerous tree species. Sold to the department of Loir-et-Cher in 1861, the Chambert-Péan estate was incorporated into the departmental asylum of Loir-et-Cher, then directed by Dr. Jules Lunier. Expanded with numerous additional buildings (the Lunier Hospice, thermal baths and annex villas), the asylum was finally closed by the Germans during the Occupation in 1943. Since the Liberation of France, the estate and the former hospice buildings have housed the Robert-Badinter School Complex, whose original premises were destroyed by bombing at the beginning of the Second World War.

== History and architecture ==
=== From the Saint-Lazare leper hospital to the priory ===
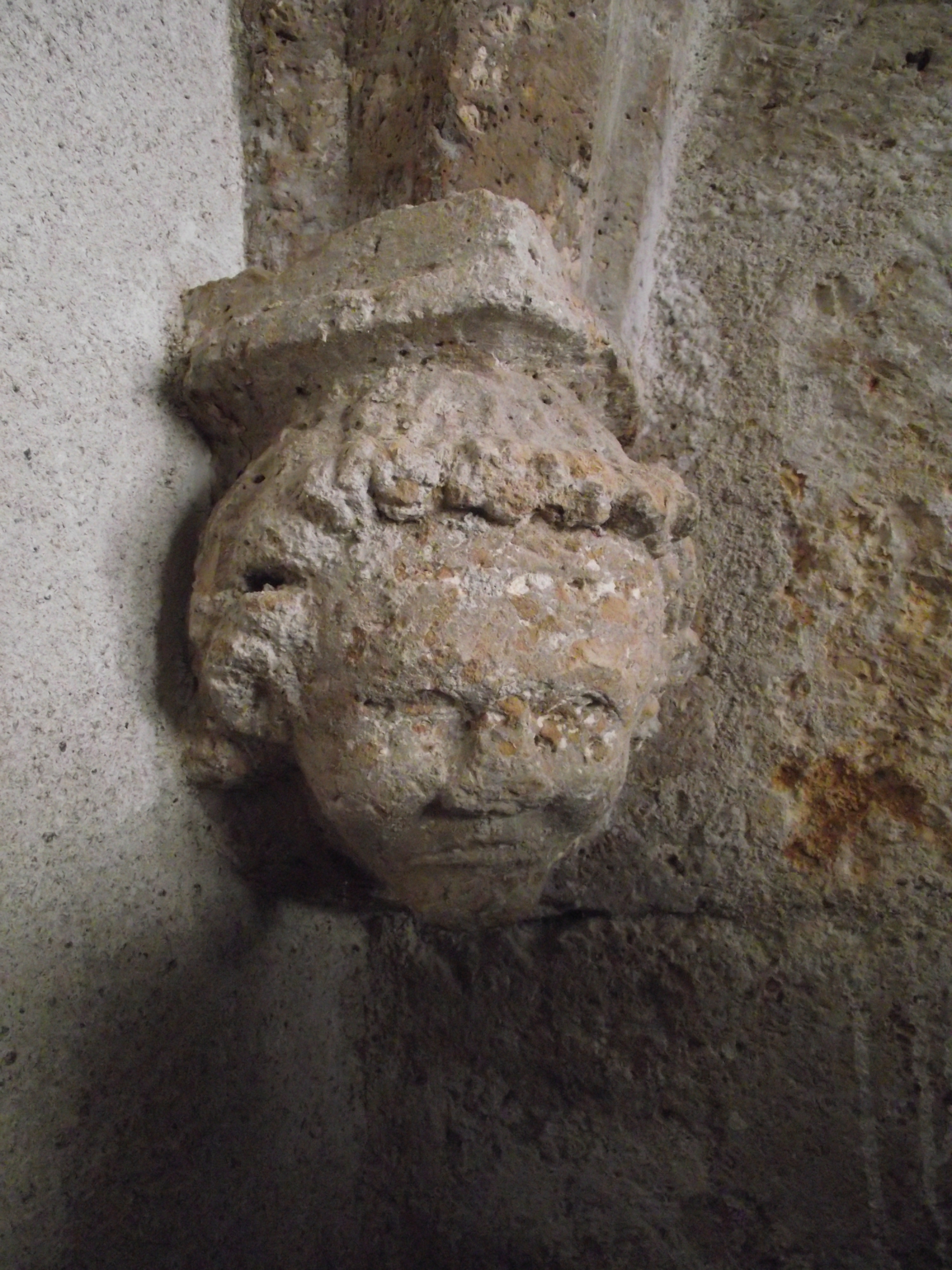
Corbel in the chapter house, 2012.

Located in the present-day Bourg-Neuf district, one kilometre from the former walls of Blois, the Saint-Lazare leper hospital was built between 1116 and 1126 on land donated by a man named Pierre de Rulez. Founded by Count Theobald IV of Blois (c. 1090–1152) and Geoffroy of Lèves, Bishop of Chartres (d. 1149), it was originally intended for the isolation of people affected by leprosy. Destroyed by fire in 1190, the leper hospital was rebuilt between 1232 and 1261, the year in which its chapel was dedicated to the Holy Spirit.

By the 16th century, leprosy had largely disappeared from Europe and the institution was converted into a priory of the Congregation of France (the Génovéfains), administered by commendatory priors. Two centuries later, the Génovéfains remodelled Saint-Lazare Priory by constructing a large rectangular building in a style similar to that of the contemporary Abbey of Bourg-Moyen. Flanked on its right by a small pavilion, the structure comprised two storeys decorated with regularly spaced windows arranged in bays, together with a roof featuring broken slopes and dormer windows topped with triangular pediments. In front of the building's southern façade, the Génovéfains laid out a large French formal garden consisting of embroidered parterres surrounded by clipped boxwood hedges.

Almost nothing survives from these original buildings. However, in front of the present-day Hugo Building of the Robert-Badinter School Complex, the foundations of the southern wall of the former medieval chapel remain visible. Masonry elements incorporated into the current structure also survive, notably a small room (now the chapter house) covered by a rib vault with simply chamfered arches of Beauce limestone resting on corbels decorated with heads in the style of the 14th century. Finally, several decorative elements from the 18th century remain, including Ionic pilasters and especially rocaille-style wainscot panelling, which now adorn the ground floor of the Hugo Building.

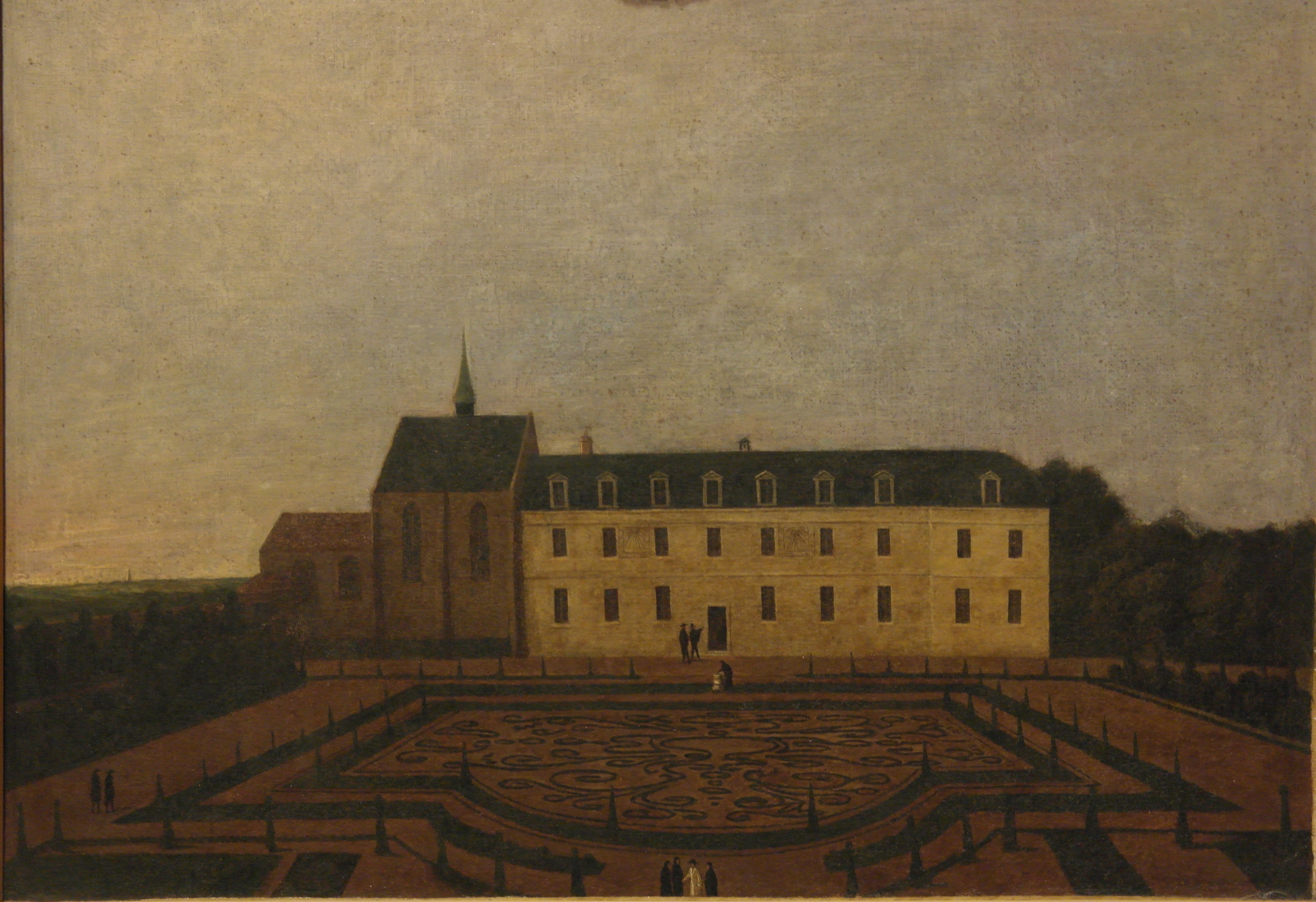
Anonymous painting depicting Saint-Lazare Priory (18th century).

Besides these few remains, two documents provide information about the general appearance of the former Saint-Lazare Priory: first, a brief description produced during the French Revolution, and above all an 18th-century painting now held in the collections of the Musée des Beaux-Arts de Blois. Annie Cosperec explains that "the painting preserved in the museum shows the silhouette of the [medieval] chapel adjoining the western gable of the 18th-century building. It includes a choir with a flat apse lit by tall lancet windows and a lower nave, which probably date from the 13th-century reconstruction".

=== From the Revolution to the 1830s ===
Confiscated as national property in 1791, Saint-Lazare Priory was sold to the Blois notary François Riffault, who disposed of it two years later. It was then purchased by former Mayor of Paris Nicolas Chambon de Montaux (1748–1826), who intended to establish free courses in medicine there.[3] He demolished the church and the medieval buildings on the estate, retaining only the residence constructed by the Génovéfains in the 18th century.

Resold to Captain Hauser, the estate was leased in 1816 to General Joseph Hugo (1773–1828), father of the writer after whom the present building is named. Joseph Hugo resided there with his mistress, Marie-Catherine Thomas, until the death of his wife in 1821. Widowed, he purchased the estate in 1822, but sold it the following year to a physician, Dr. Gay.

In 1834, the former priory finally passed to a banker named Jean-Simon Chambert-Péan, who profoundly transformed it. He demolished the priory church as well as all remaining medieval buildings, preserving only the main residence erected by the Génovéfains in the 18th century.

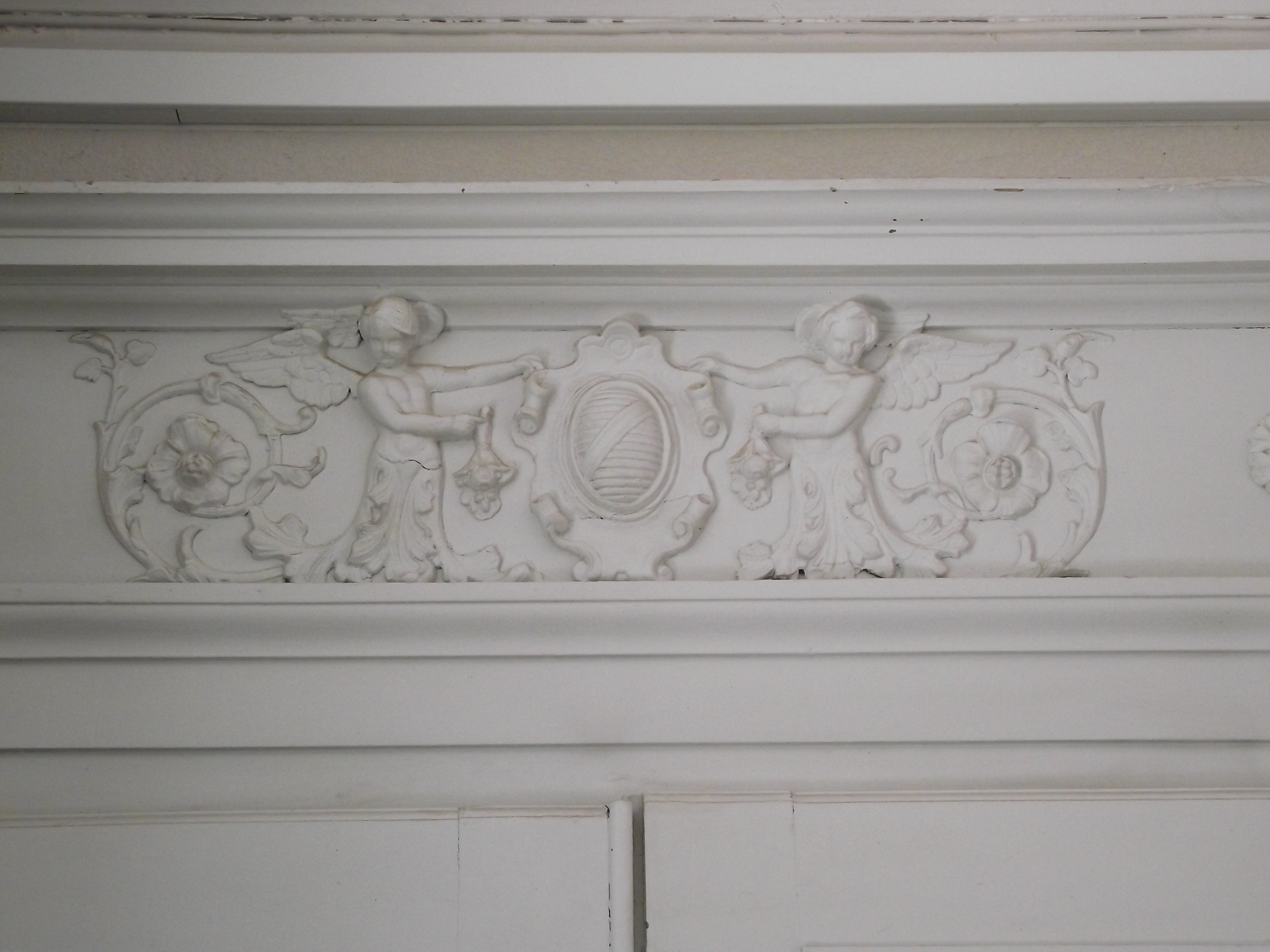
Putti bearing the arms of Jean-Simon Chambert-Péan. Present-day Hugo Building, 2012.

=== The Saint-Lazare Villa or Château ===
On the site of the Génovéfains' residence, Jean-Simon Chambert-Péan had a villa built beginning in 1834. Flanked on the west by a small structure incorporating the remains of the medieval leper hospital (including the present-day chapter house), the Saint-Lazare Villa was a large rectangular building of restrained Neoclassical style. Consisting of two storeys and an enlarged attic level beneath a mansard-style roof, it featured two projecting wings forming the building's central projection. The villa's facade was decorated with giant pilasters at each corner, and vertical window surrounds. On the upper floor, these elements continued upward to the dormer windows topped with triangular pediments. Finally, flat stringcourses separated the different levels and the cornice from the architrave. Having undergone little alteration, the present-day "Hugo Building" differs from the original villa only through the lowering of its first-floor windows and, above all, the addition of a cast iron canopy above the main entrance.

A man of refined taste, Jean-Simon Chambert-Péan carefully arranged the interior of his villa, judging from the decorative elements that survive in the current building. The ground-floor rooms are decorated with niches and door surrounds surmounted by entablatures adorned with stucco decoration (including putti bearing the owner's coat of arms, among other motifs).

A man of refined taste, Jean-Simon Chambert-Péan carefully arranged the interior of his villa, judging from the decorative elements that survive in the current building. The ground-floor rooms are decorated with niches and door surrounds surmounted by entablatures adorned with stucco decoration (including putti bearing the owner's coat of arms, among other motifs).

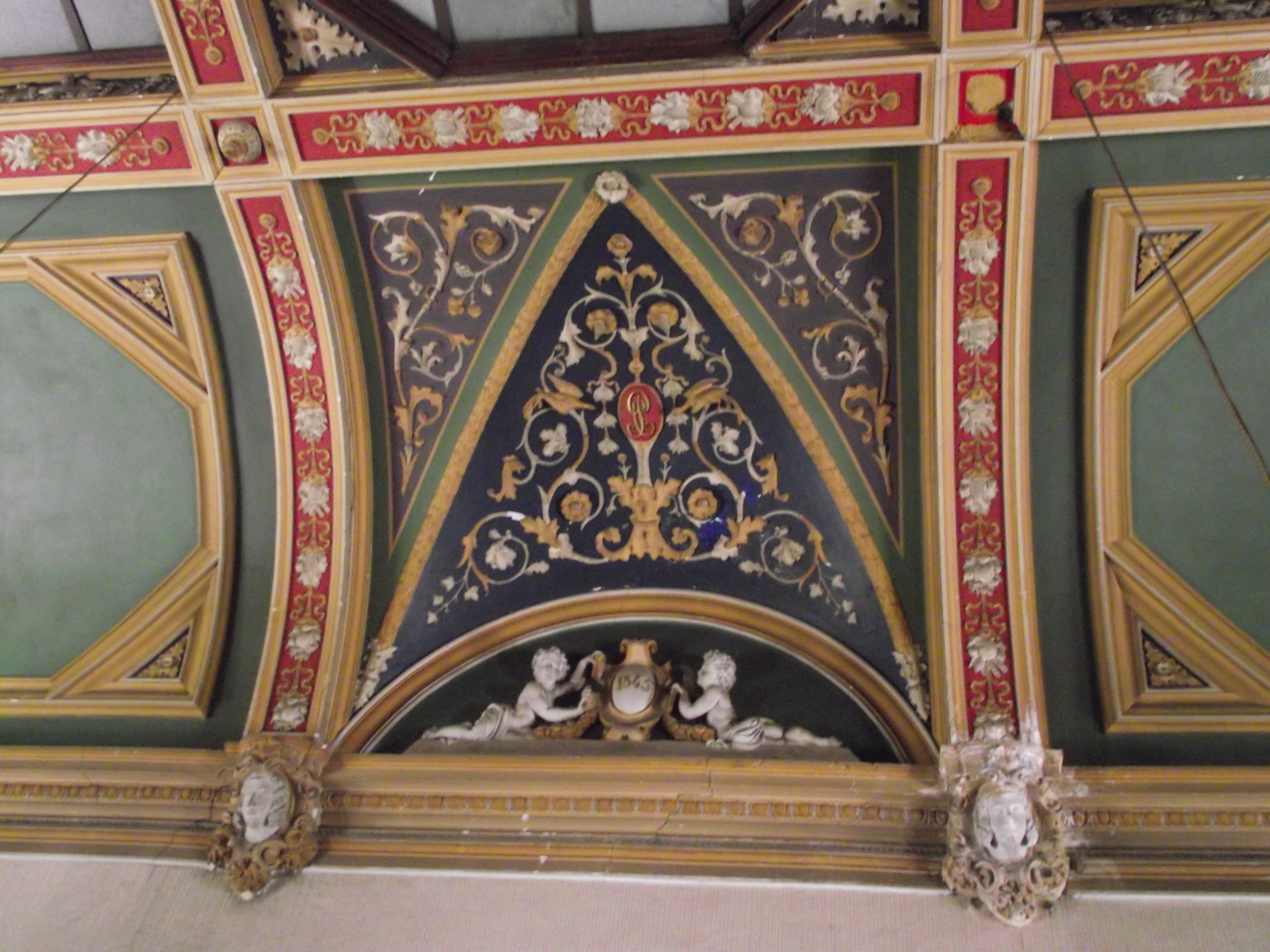
Side lunette of the Chambert-Péan Room (formerly the "Beautiful Gallery"). Scrollwork decoration bearing the monogram of J.-S. Chambert-Péan and a shield dated 1845.

Above all, on the attic level of the villa's right wing, Jean-Simon Chambert-Péan created a vast room which he called the "Beautiful Gallery" (Belle galerie), where he displayed his rich art collections. Completed in 1845, as indicated by the date inscribed in a ceiling medallion, the room features decoration in the style of the Early Renaissance. Covered by a barrel vault, it is punctuated by transverse and longitudinal arch ribs decorated with a central moulding, which divide the ceiling into square compartments containing polygonal or circular coffers. Pendant bosses decorated with rose motifs adorn the intersections of these ribs, which spring from a moulded cornice through the intermediary of mascarons framed by foliage. Finally, the ceiling is embellished with lunettes occupying both the corners and the side sections of the room.

Composed of a pointed arch and a round arch, the side lunettes formed by the ribs are decorated in their lower section with a pair of reclining putti holding a shield bearing the date 1845 and, in their upper section, with a large scrollwork design developing around a central stem. The spandrels of these lunettes carry smaller scrollwork ornaments executed in delicate relief. Quite different from these are the corner lunettes, which are triangular in shape and display in their centre a large candelabrum provided with Volutes at its base.

Exceptional for its vivid and contrasting colours (royal-blue and green backgrounds, crimson-red ribs, reliefs highlighted with gold, etc.), the present-day Chambert-Péan Room is equally remarkable for the richness of its doorway decoration. Its door leaves are ornamented with figures and floral motifs in the Henri II style executed in high relief. Unfortunately, no document allows the artistic authorship of this unique decoration to be established. Nevertheless, for researchers such as Annie Cosperec, the stylistic similarities between the "Beautiful Gallery" and the Francis I Wing of the Château de Blois or the great hall of the Hôtel d'Alluye suggest the hand of Félix Duban or one of his pupils, such as M. Martin-Monestier.

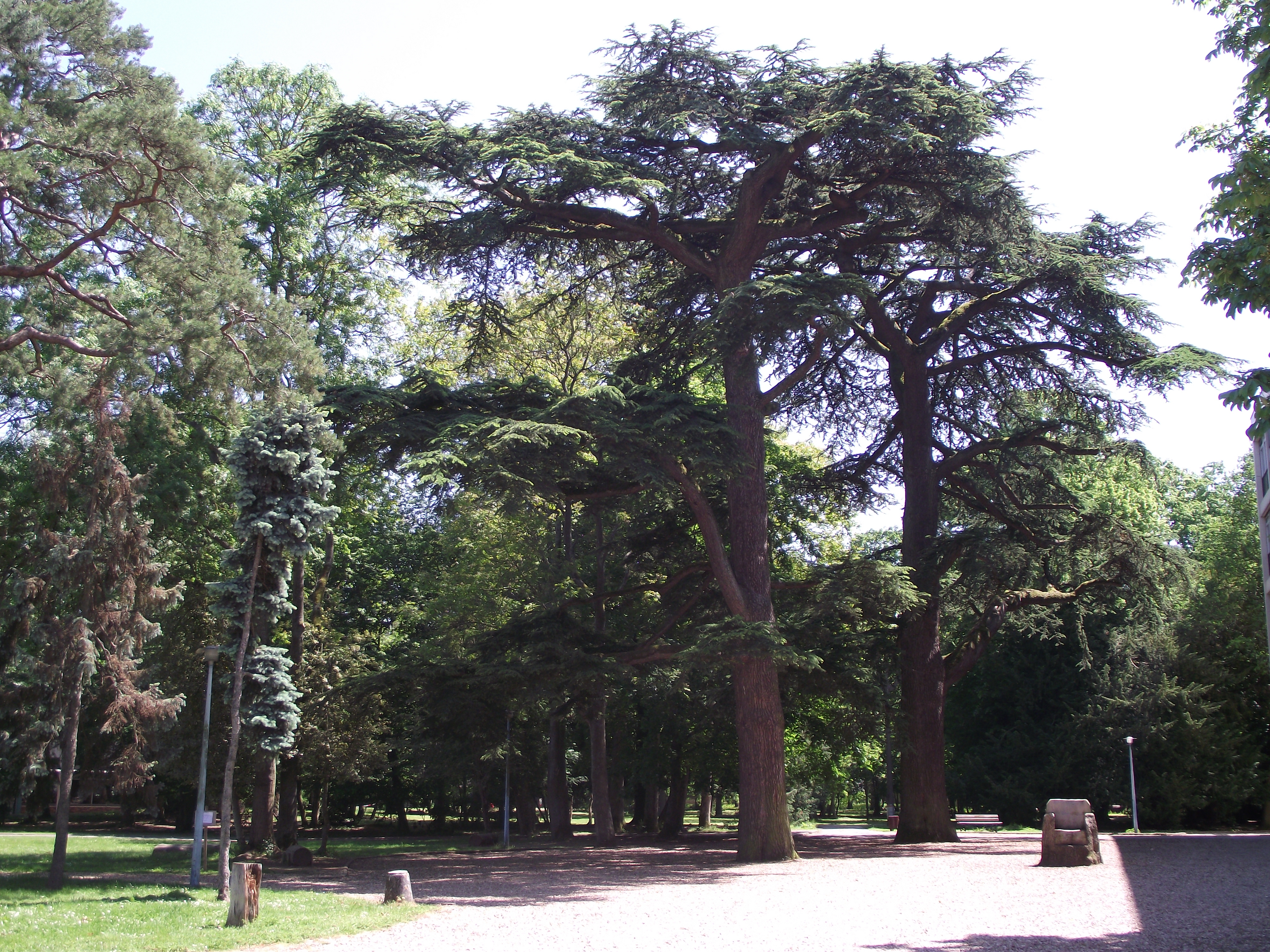
Cedars in the park planted by J.-S. Chambert-Péan, May 2012.

In any case, the appearance of the room has changed considerably since the 19th century. The raising of the floor level reduced the size of the "Beautiful Gallery", confining it to the attic level alone, whereas it had previously occupied the half-storey below. Above all, the room was originally illuminated by a central skylight built into the roof. The dormer windows that now admit light were originally blocked and treated as false windows, as is still the case on the south side.

Around the Saint-Lazare Villa, Jean-Simon Chambert-Péan laid out a large English-style park planted with rare tree species. Long renowned, this park constituted an important arboreal collection, of which little now survives.

=== The former Chambert-Péan collections ===
Between the 1830s and the 1850s, Jean-Simon Chambert-Péan housed in the "Beautiful Gallery" a significant collection of paintings, engravings, drawings, sculptures and other objects of curiosity, together with a library that enjoyed a genuine reputation among the inhabitants of Loir-et-Cher. In 1861, however, the banker's collection was dispersed by his heirs, and the city of Blois acquired most of its contents. These works have since formed the foundation of the heritage collections of the city's Museum of Fine Arts.

Among these works were Eliezer and Rebecca at the Well by Sébastien Bourdon, Battle between Turks and Christians by Pietro Graziani, Solomon and the Queen of Sheba by Caspar Van der Hoecke, and Hercules and Omphale by Antonio Zanchi.

=== The Lunier Hospice and the Loir-et-Cher Departmental Asylum ===
Augustin-Thierry High School around 1960.1: Remains of the 13th-century priory.2: Saint-Lazare Villa (1834) 3: Buildings of the Lunier Hospice (1865–1870)4: Thermal pavilion 5: Director's residence6: Isolation pavilions 7: Remains of the Saint-Lazare Villa park

Following the death of Jean-Simon Chambert-Péan, the General Council of Loir-et-Cher purchased the Saint-Lazare Villa and its surrounding estate in 1861 to expand the lunatic asylum established by Dr. Billod on Avenue de Paris (now Avenue Maunoury) in May 1846. Under the direction of Dr. Jules Lunier and the architect Stanislas Beau, several new buildings were added to the villa. To the east of the original structure, a second building was erected in the same style in 1872; this is now the Lunier Building of the Robert-Badinter School Complex.Identical to the Saint-Lazare Villa in its plan and elevation, the Lunier Villa differed in its building materials and architectural detailing. Whereas the older structure was built of Beauce limestone and tuffeau stone, the newer one employed stone from Chauvigny. Set back from both the Saint-Lazare and Lunier Villas, a third and narrower building connected the two, creating a symmetrical composition typical of 19th-century hospital architecture. Demolished around 1970, this connecting structure was replaced by "Building J" of the school complex and its present-day boarding school.

Additional buildings were later added to the complex. These included a thermal establishment located behind the asylum's central building and a series of comfortable pavilions scattered throughout the park. Intended for the isolation of the wealthiest patients, these brick-and-stone pavilions, roofed with wooden canopies, were mostly demolished during the 1970s. Only three survive today: Les Tilleuls ("The Lime Trees"), where some classes are held, and Les Roses ("The Roses") and Les Acacias ("The Acacias"), which serve as official residences for staff members of the present-day Robert-Badinter High School.

Despite the extensive work carried out to convert the Saint-Lazare Villa into a psychiatric institution, the park planted by Jean-Simon Chambert-Péan underwent only minor alterations. An orchard was added, and paths were laid out to encourage walks by Dr. Lunier's patients.

=== From Augustin-Thierry High School to the Robert-Badinter School Complex ===
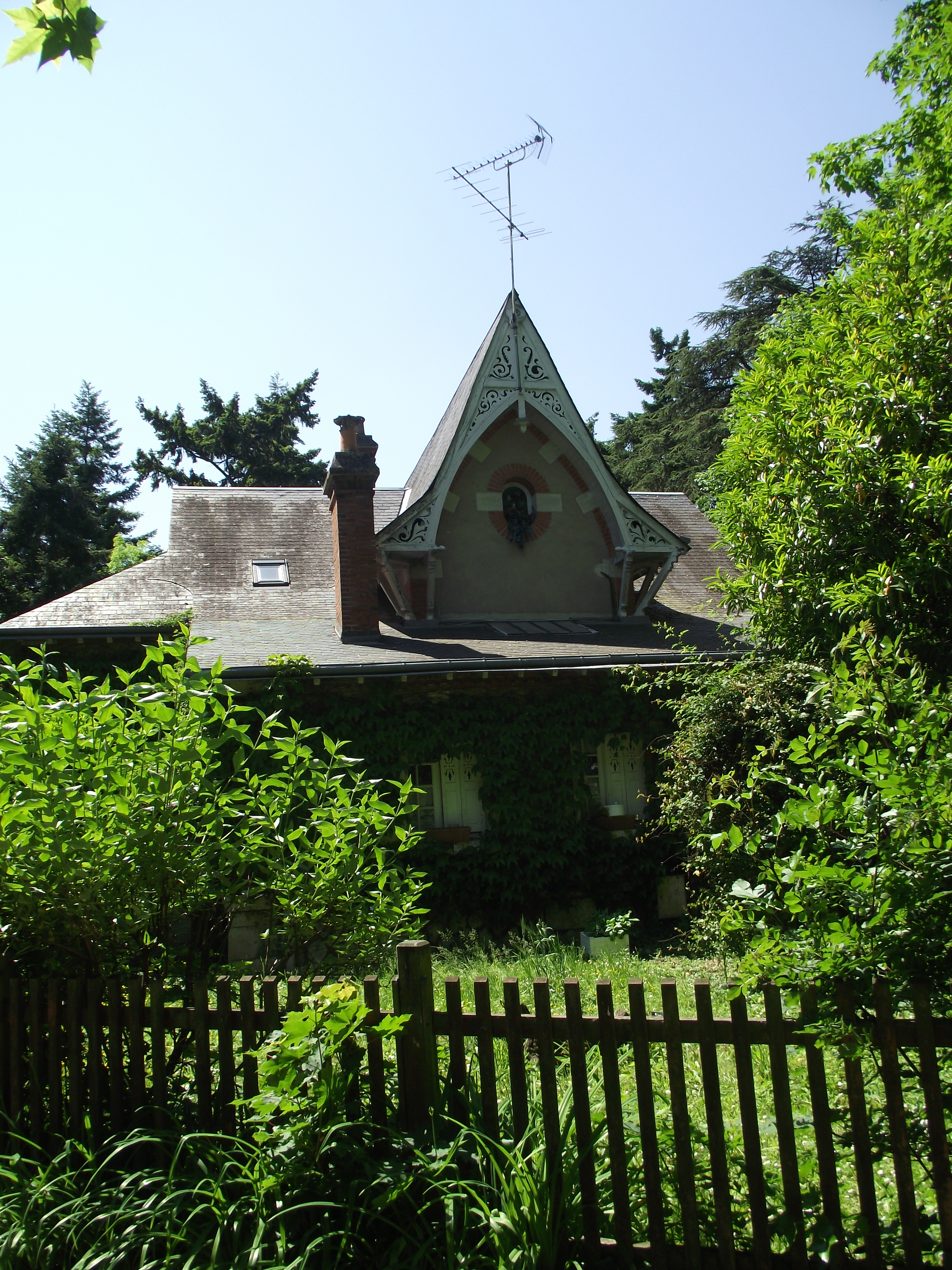
Les Acacias, May 2012.

In 1940 or 1943, the Loir-et-Cher Departmental Asylum was closed on German orders. The 561 patients still residing there were transferred to hospitals in central and southwestern France, while the medical staff were permanently dismissed in October.

Following the Liberation of France, the Lunier Hospice was converted into an educational institution. Deprived of buildings since the bombing raids of June 1940, the students and teachers of the Augustin-Thierry College gradually took possession of the estate. The seventh-year pupils (equivalent to the final year of primary school) moved in during October 1944; the sixth and fifth forms at the start of the 1945 school year; the fourth and third forms at All Saints' Day; and the upper secondary classes in January 1946. Between 400 and 500 pupils, supervised by around thirty teachers, thus replaced the patients formerly housed in the hospital complex.

Shortly thereafter, Augustin-Thierry College was promoted to the status of a high school in October 1946. During the following decades, numerous changes affected the former estates of Chambert-Péan and Dr. Lunier. These included the reduction of the park through the construction of several rectangular school buildings in the 1950s and 1960s, and, above all, the demolition of the building that had formerly linked the Saint-Lazare Villa and the Lunier Pavilion at the beginning of the 1970s.

In the early 1990s, the Regional Education Authority planned to demolish the remains of the former priory and the Lunier Hospice to replace them with more modern buildings. However, the project met with opposition from part of the teaching staff and local heritage advocates, who established an "Association for the Preservation of the Historic Buildings and Park of Augustin-Thierry High School". Ultimately, the historic buildings were entered in the General Inventory of Cultural Heritage in 1992, and an architectural study of the buildings was undertaken by the art historian Annie Cosperec.

== Gallery ==
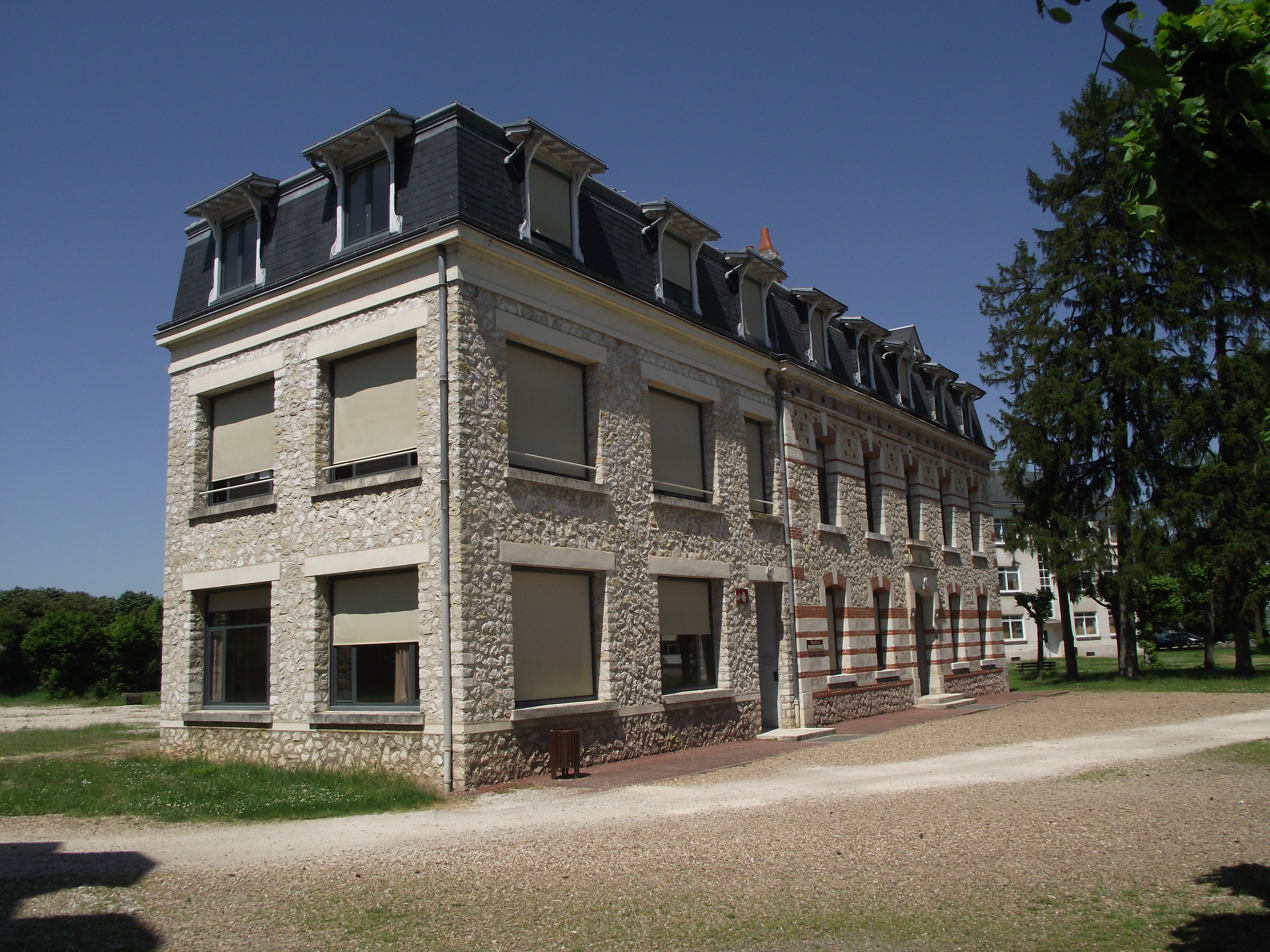
Les Tilleuls ("The Lime Trees").

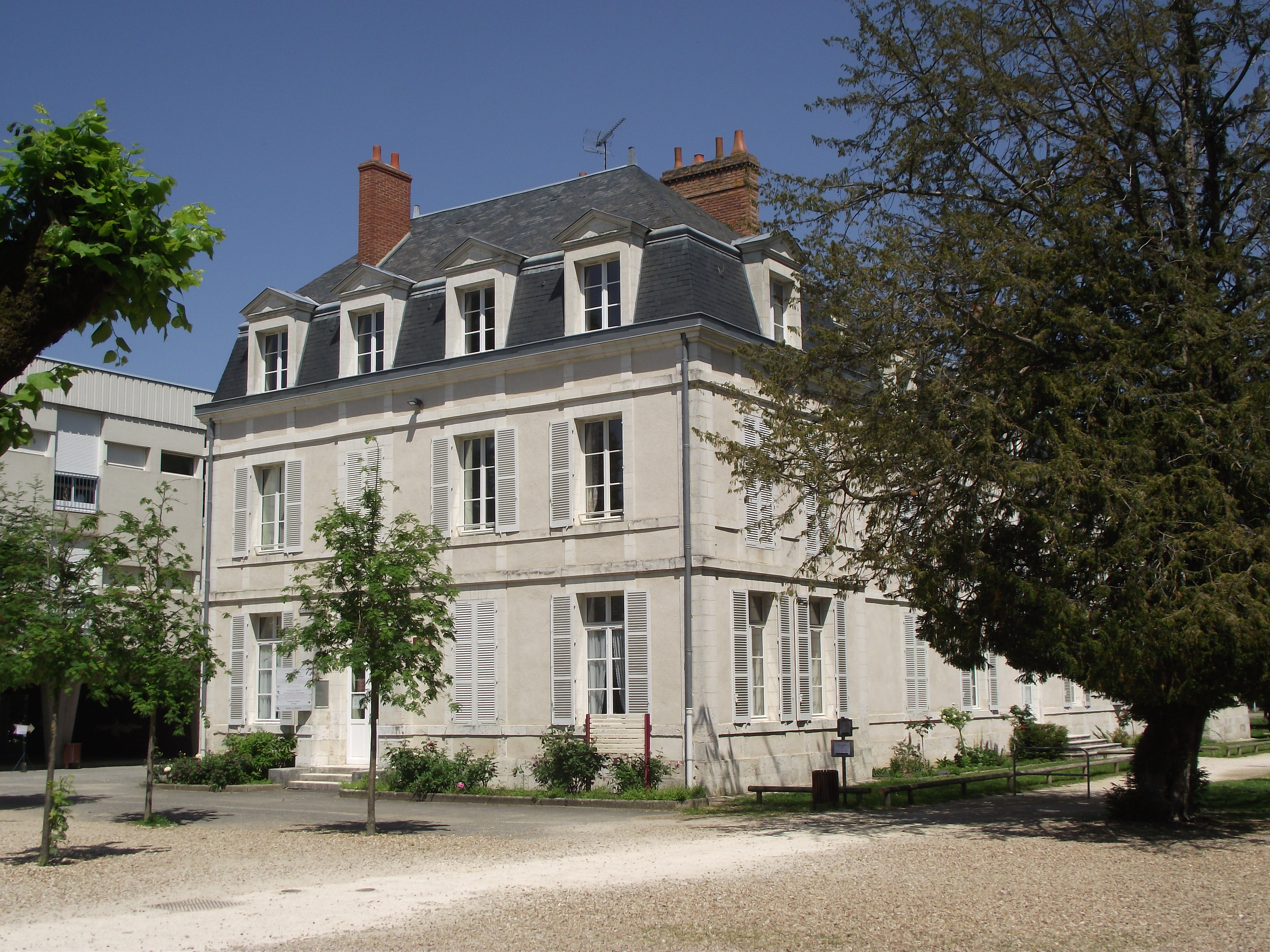
Lunier Villa.

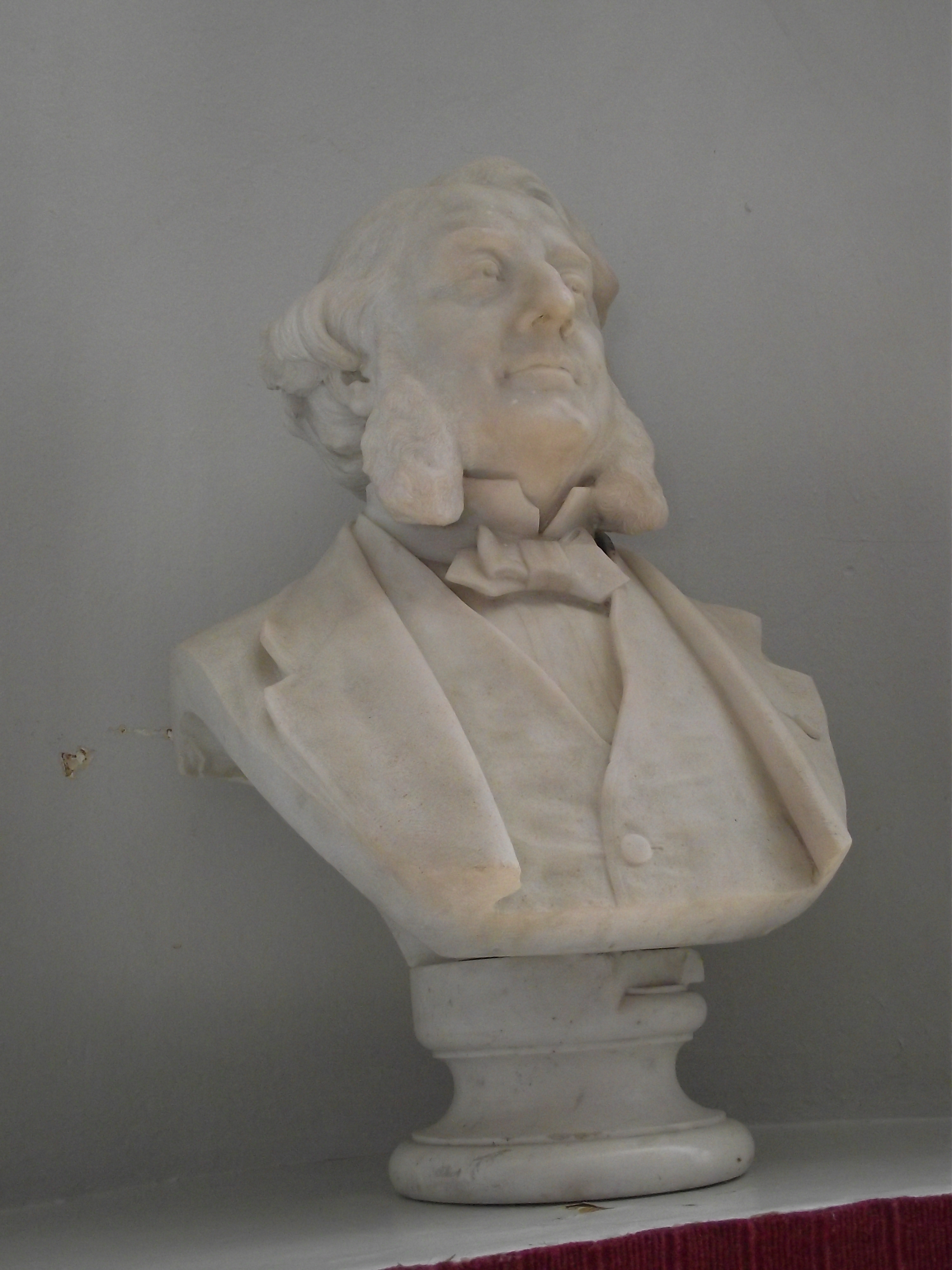
Bust of Dr. Lunier, staircase of the Hugo Building.

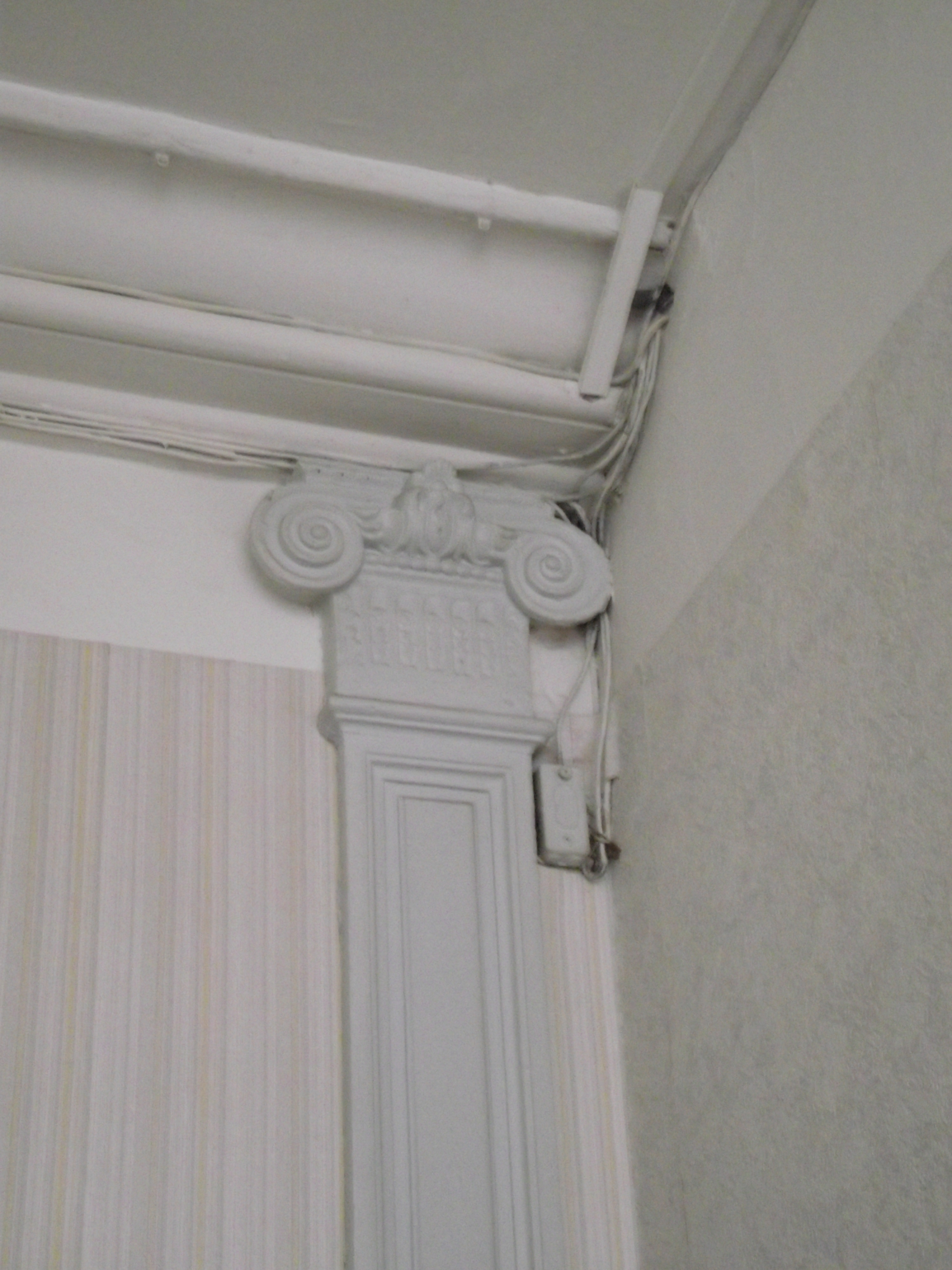
Ionic pilaster, ground floor of the Hugo Building.

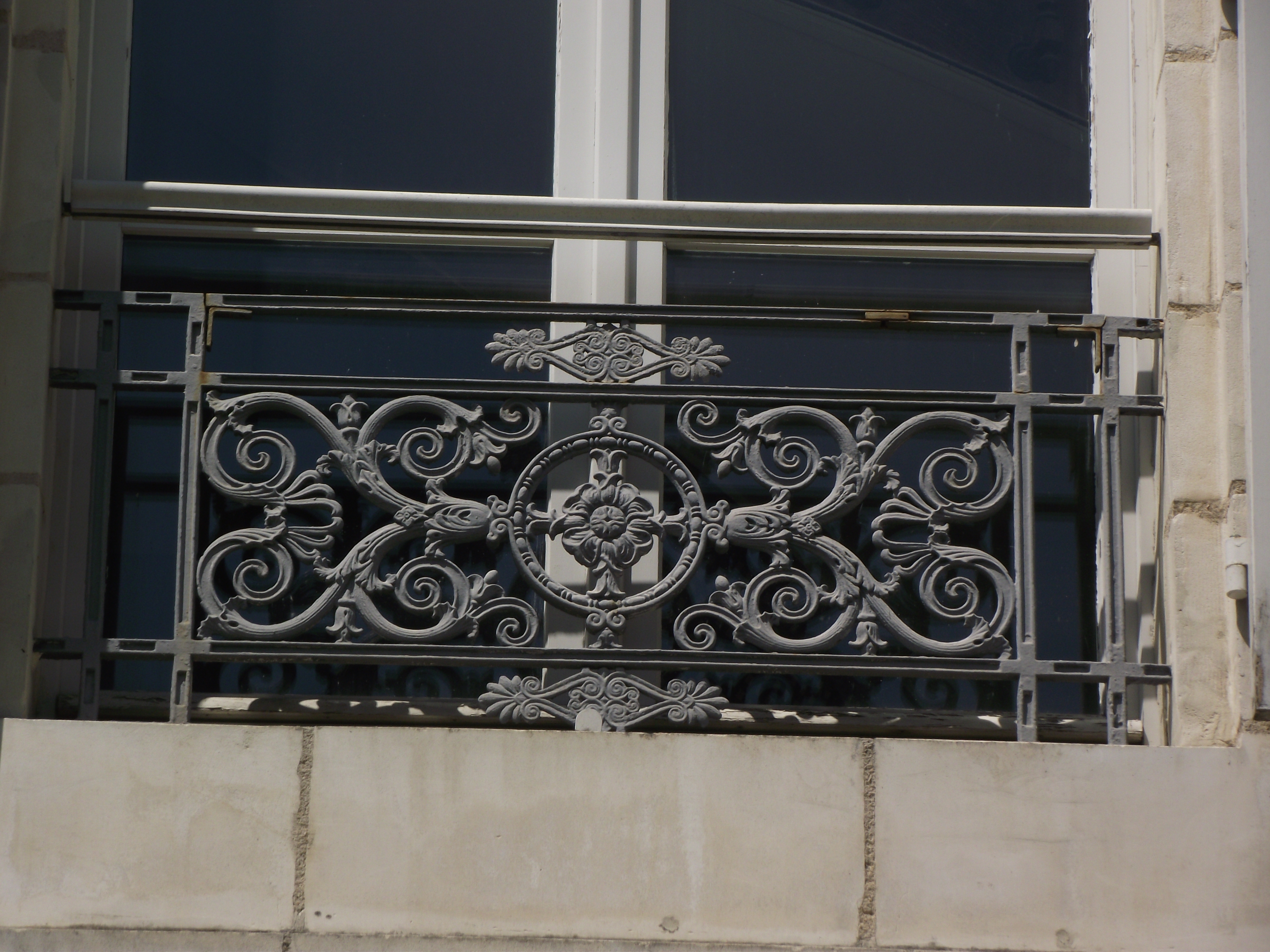
Wrought-metal railing, Hugo Building.

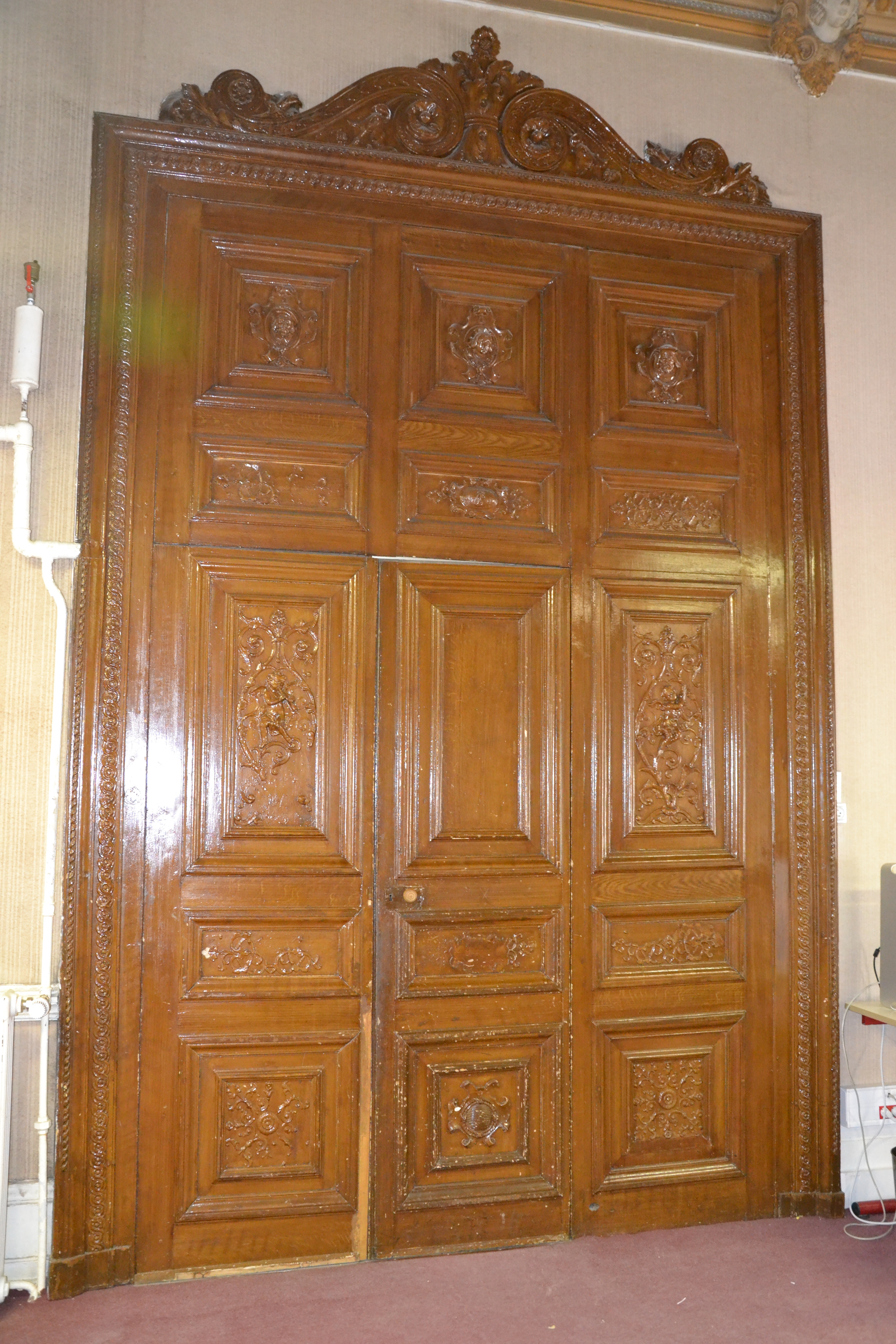
Monumental doorway of the Chambert-Péan Room (formerly the "Beautiful Gallery").

== See also ==
- Robert-Badinter School Complex
- Loir-et-Cher Departmental Asylum

== Bibliography ==
=== Early works ===
- Bergevin, Louis-Catherine; Dupré, Alexandre (1846). "Saint-Lazare". Histoire de Blois. 6. E. Dézairs: 541–543.
- de Croy, J. "Notice sur le cartulaire de la léproserie Saint-Lazare de Blois", Revue de Loir-et-Cher, 1899.
- Doutrebente, Gabriel (1900). "Documents pour servir à l'histoire du prieuré Saint-Lazare, actuellement villa Lunier" [Documents Contributing to the History of Saint-Lazare Priory, Now Lunier Villa]. Mémoires de la Société des Sciences et Lettres de Loir-et-Cher. XIV: 71–90.
- Dupré, Alexandre. "Renseignements sur les maladreries et Maison-Dieu du Blésois", Revue de Loir-et-Cher, 1897.
- de La Saussaye, Louis (1867). "Hôtel Saint-Lazare" [Saint-Lazare House]. Blois et ses environs : Guide historique et artistique dans le Blésois et le nord de la Touraine. Aubry: 104–106.
- Lesueur, Frédéric. "Saint-Lazare", in Congrès archéologique, 1925, pp. 148–149.
- Lesueur, Frédéric. "La maladrerie Saint-Lazare", in Les églises de Loir-et-Cher, Picard, Paris, 1970, p. 78.
- Metais, Ch. "La maladrerie Saint-Lazare", in Le Loir-et-Cher historique, 1892, pp. 121–122.

=== Modern works ===
- Cosperec, Annie (1997). "L'Actuel Lycée Augustin-Thierry : le prieuré et la villa Saint-Lazare, l'hospice Lunier" [The Present-Day Augustin-Thierry High School: Saint-Lazare Priory and Villa, the Lunier Hospice]. Mélanges offerts à Claude Leymarios (in French). C.D.P.A. 41: 71–77. OCLC 468209712.
- Dansault, Virginie. "La léproserie Saint Lazare au lycée Augustin Thierry", Association pour la protection du Vieux Blois et de ses environs, 2008–2009.
- Denis, Yves (1988). Histoire de Blois et de sa région [History of Blois and Its Region] (in French). Privat.
- Duchemin, Pierre (1997). "Une famille d'aliénistes tourangeaux au XIXe siècle : les docteurs Baillarger, Lunier et Doutrebente" [A Family of Alienists from Touraine in the 19th Century: Doctors Baillarger, Lunier and Doutrebente]. Bulletin de la Société Archéologique de Touraine. XLV: 229–238.
- Guignard, Bruno (2007). "Aliénés" [The Insane]. Blois de A à Z (in French). Éditions Alan Sutton: 7–12. ISBN 2849106216.
- Nourrisson, Pascal (2005). Blois (in French). Chambray-lès-Tours: C.L.D. éditions. p. 239. ISBN 2-85443-433-1.

=== Further documentation ===
- Victor Auger, Thérésa Bahonda, Audrey Jeverdan, Louise Prévot, Émilie Ruiz, Leslie Thiercelin, Claire Vieville, Clément Vriet and Brigitte Génard-Kalvarisky, Rencontres silencieuses, Centre Images, 2010–2011.[23]
