= Loir-et-Cher Departmental Asylum =

Psychiatric institution in France

Loir-et-Cher Departmental Asylum (also known as the Maison de Santé Départementale de Blois)
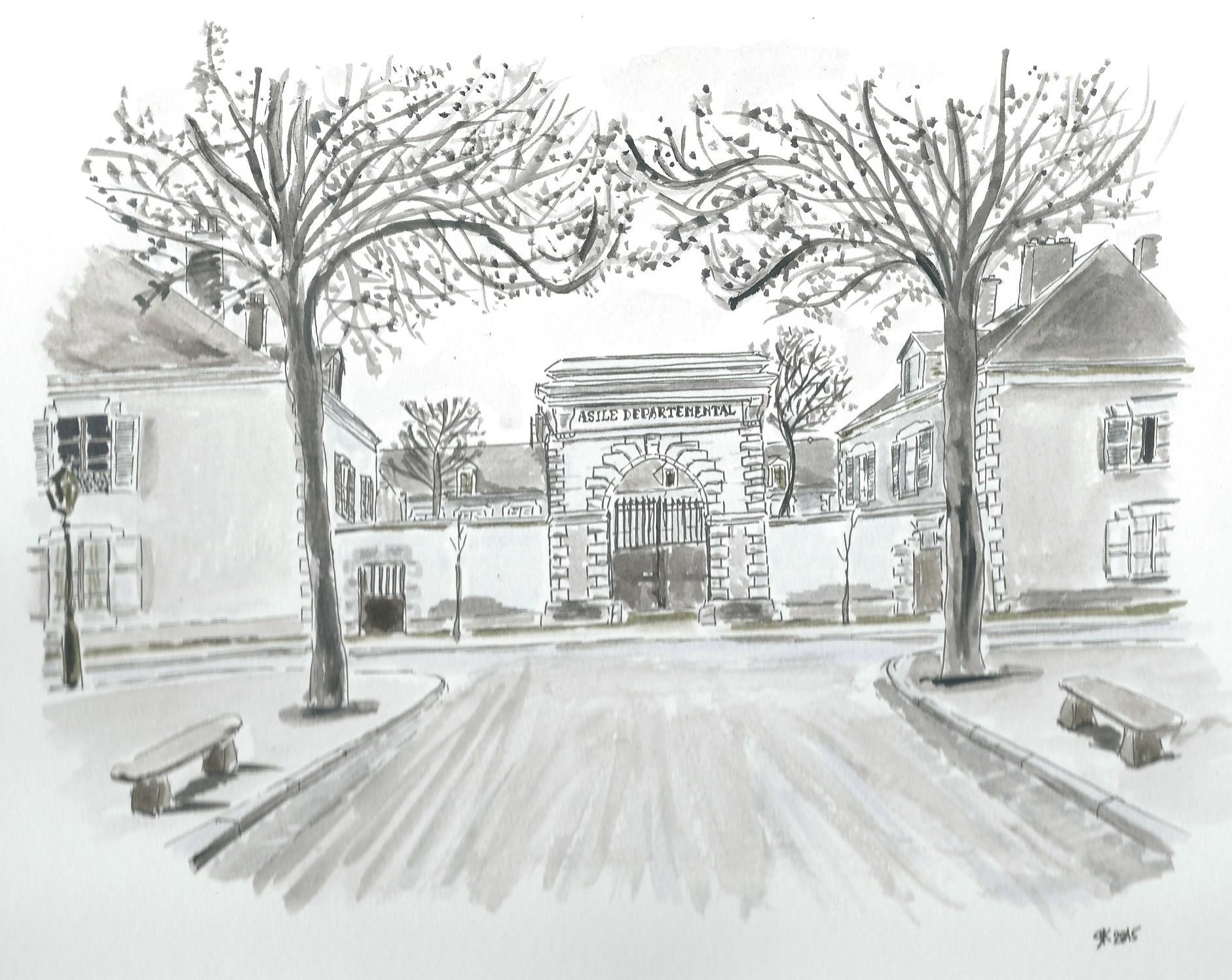
- View of the entrance to the asylum by S.K. Nemils (2015).

Geography
- Location: Intersection of Avenue de Paris (now Avenue Maunoury) and Avenue Paul-Reneaulme, Blois, France
- Coordinates: 47°35′36″N 1°20′13″E

History
- Opened: 1846 (180 years ago)
- Closed: 1943 (83 years ago)

Links
- Lists: Hospitals in France

The Loir-et-Cher Departmental Asylum, also known as the Maison de Santé Départementale de Blois, was a psychiatric institution located in the Bourg-Neuf district of Blois. Operating from 1846 to 1943, it occupied more than 70 hectares at its height and functioned as a self-contained facility on the outskirts of the town until its closure during the German Occupation in World War II.

== History ==
=== Antecedents ===
Under the Ancien régime, Blois had no dedicated facility for the mentally ill, who were typically confined in prisons, as was common practice in France. After the French Revolution, some individuals with mental disorders were placed in former convents within the city, while others remained incarcerated.

In 1827, the first asylum for the mentally ill was established in the gardens of the charitable bureau, on the site later occupied by the Monsabré parking lot, behind the Château post office. The facility consisted of 21 small and poorly equipped cells and could accommodate up to 50 residents, a capacity that quickly became inadequate.

Unable to accommodate all patients locally, the Conseil général of Loir-et-Cher reached an agreement in 1839 with the authorities of the neighboring department of Loiret to admit individuals from Loir-et-Cher into their facilities. However, the financial burden of these transfers soon prompted the Conseil général to create its own departmental asylum.

=== Creation of the departmental asylum ===
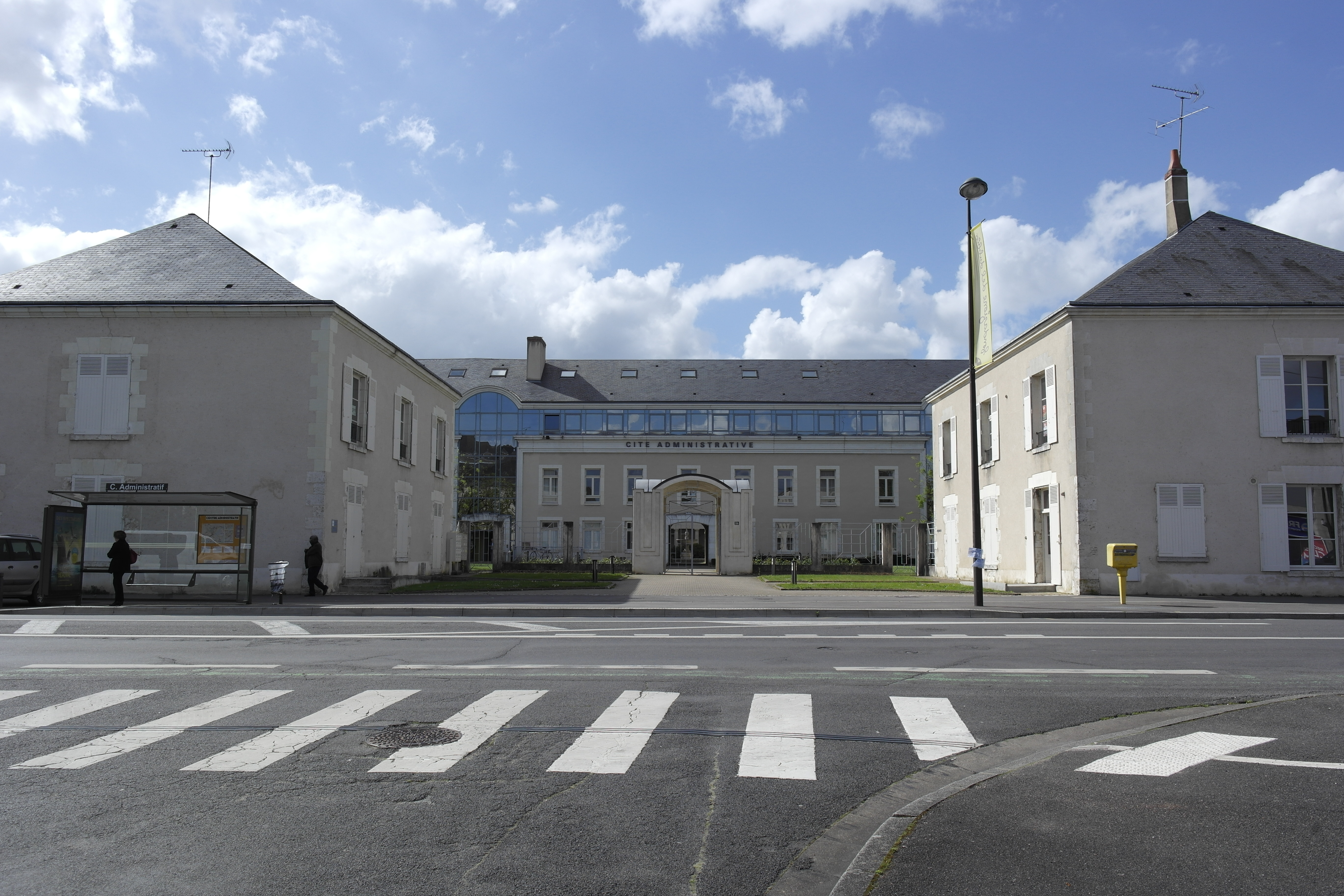
The premises of the departmental asylum now house the administrative center (2015).

A departmental asylum was established in May 1846 on Avenue de Paris (now Avenue Maunoury) in Blois. Under the direction of Dr. Ernest Billod (1819–1886), the institution expanded rapidly, growing from 77 patients in 1849 to 413 in 1852. The increase in admissions, driven by an emphasis on financial returns, eventually resulted in Dr. Billod's dismissal following accusations of mistreatment.

During this period, the asylum was expanded with several buildings designed by departmental architect Alexandre Pinault. The entrance, situated at the intersection of Avenue de Paris (now Avenue Maunoury) and Avenue Paul-Reneaulme, opened onto a courtyard bordered by the director's residence and an administrative building. A second gateway provided access to the main asylum courtyard, opposite a chapel served by a resident chaplain. The men's and women's quarters were arranged on either side of the courtyard and divided into sections for quiet, senile, epileptic, agitated, and affluent patients.

Within the institution several workshops, including textile weaving, carpentry, basketry, clog-making, shoemaking, tailoring, and sewing, offered patients occupational activities and allowed the production of everyday items. Recreational activities such as walks, gymnastics, singing, and theatrical or magic-lantern performances were also organized.

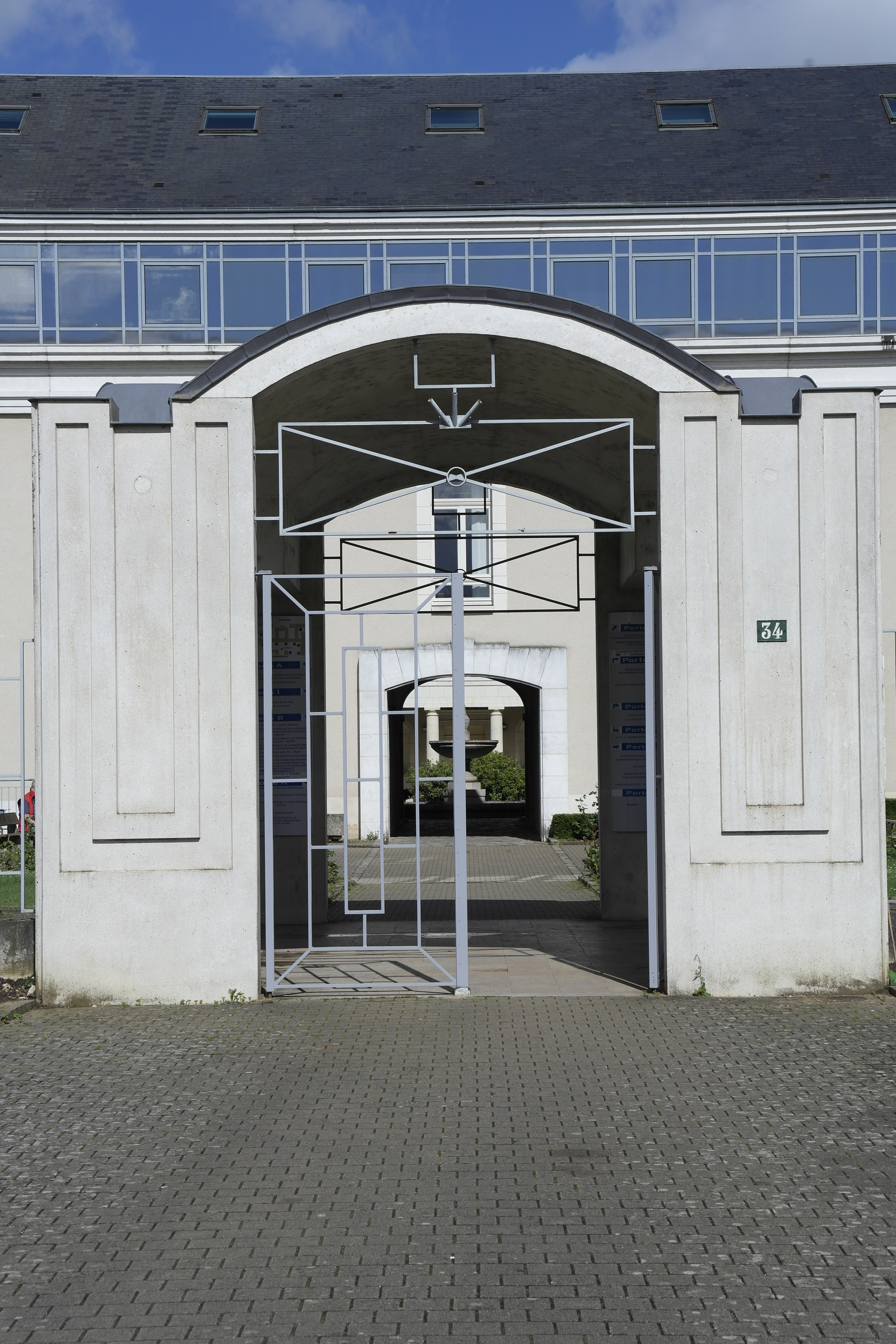
Current porch of the administrative complex (Avenue Maunoury).

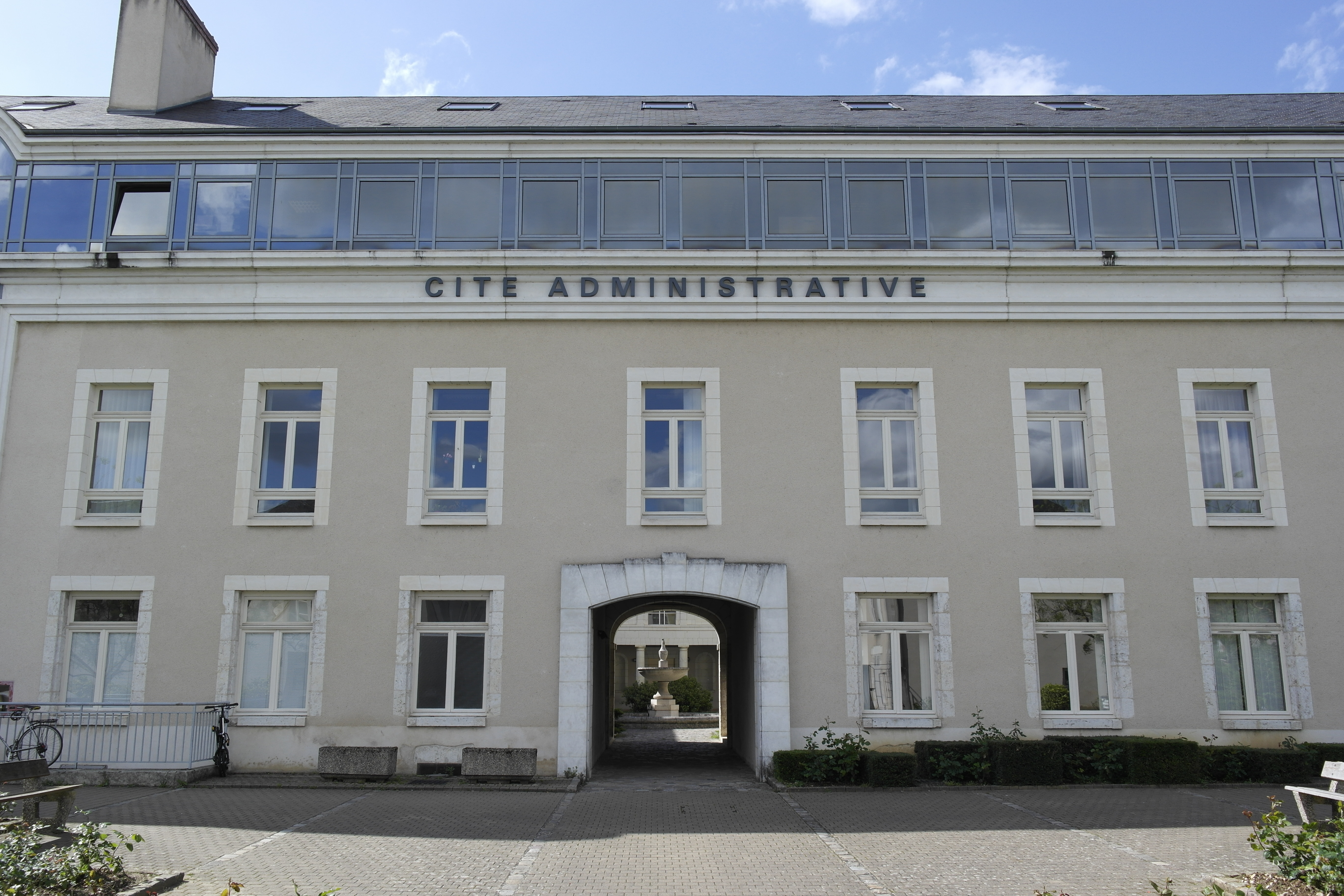
The administrative complex previously housed the departmental asylum.

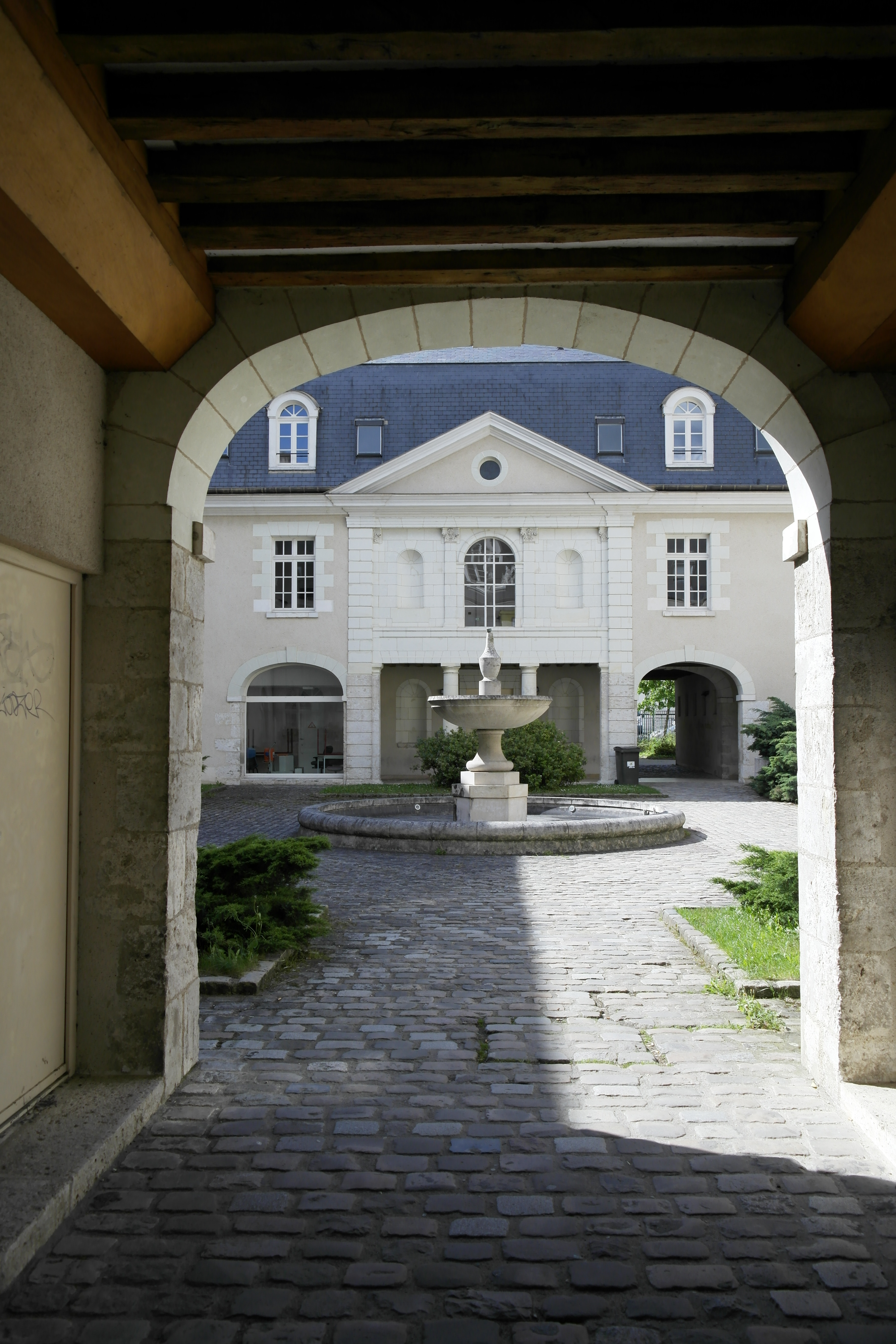
South entrance to the main courtyard of the former asylum.

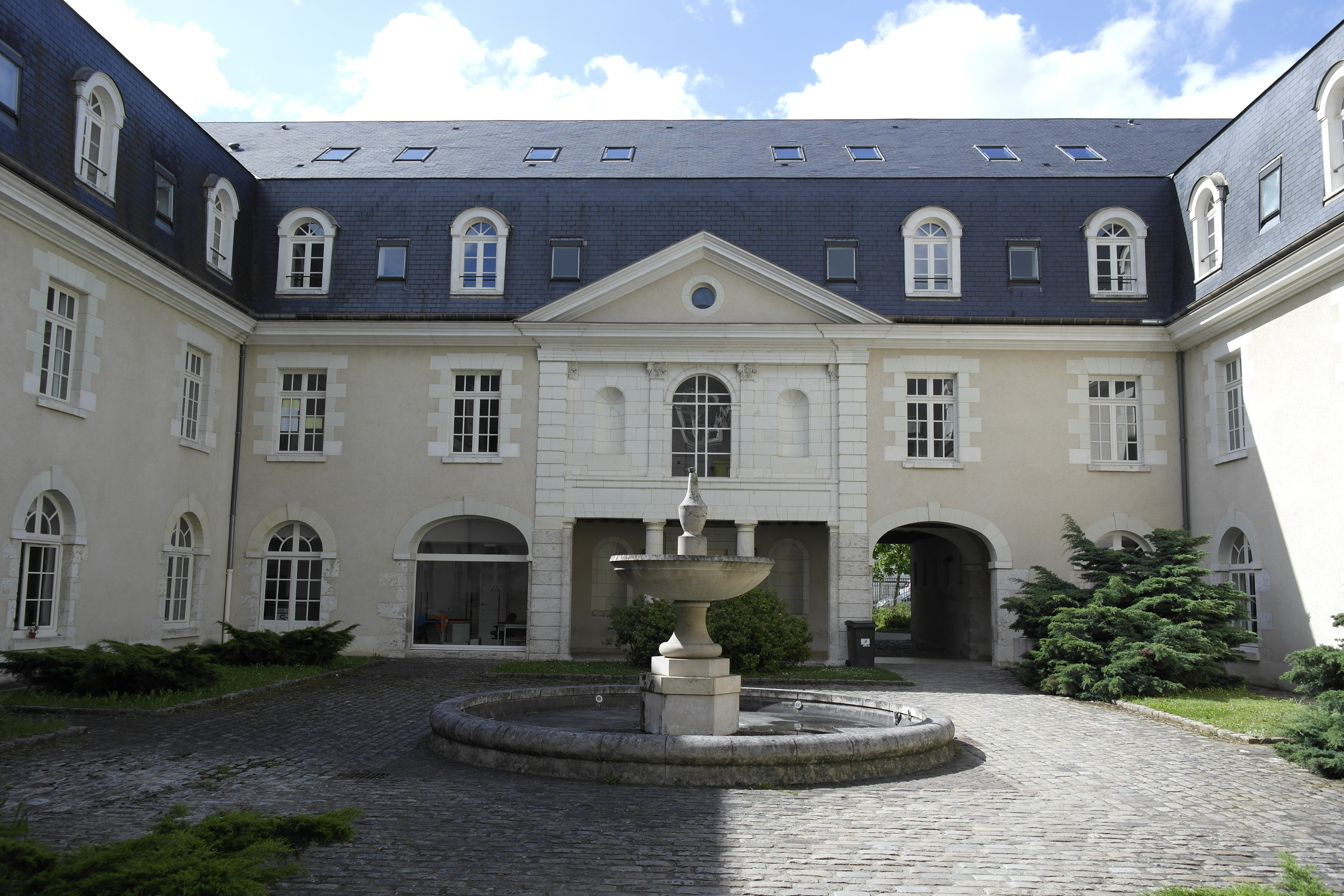
Main courtyard of the former asylum. The north wing housed the institution's chapel.

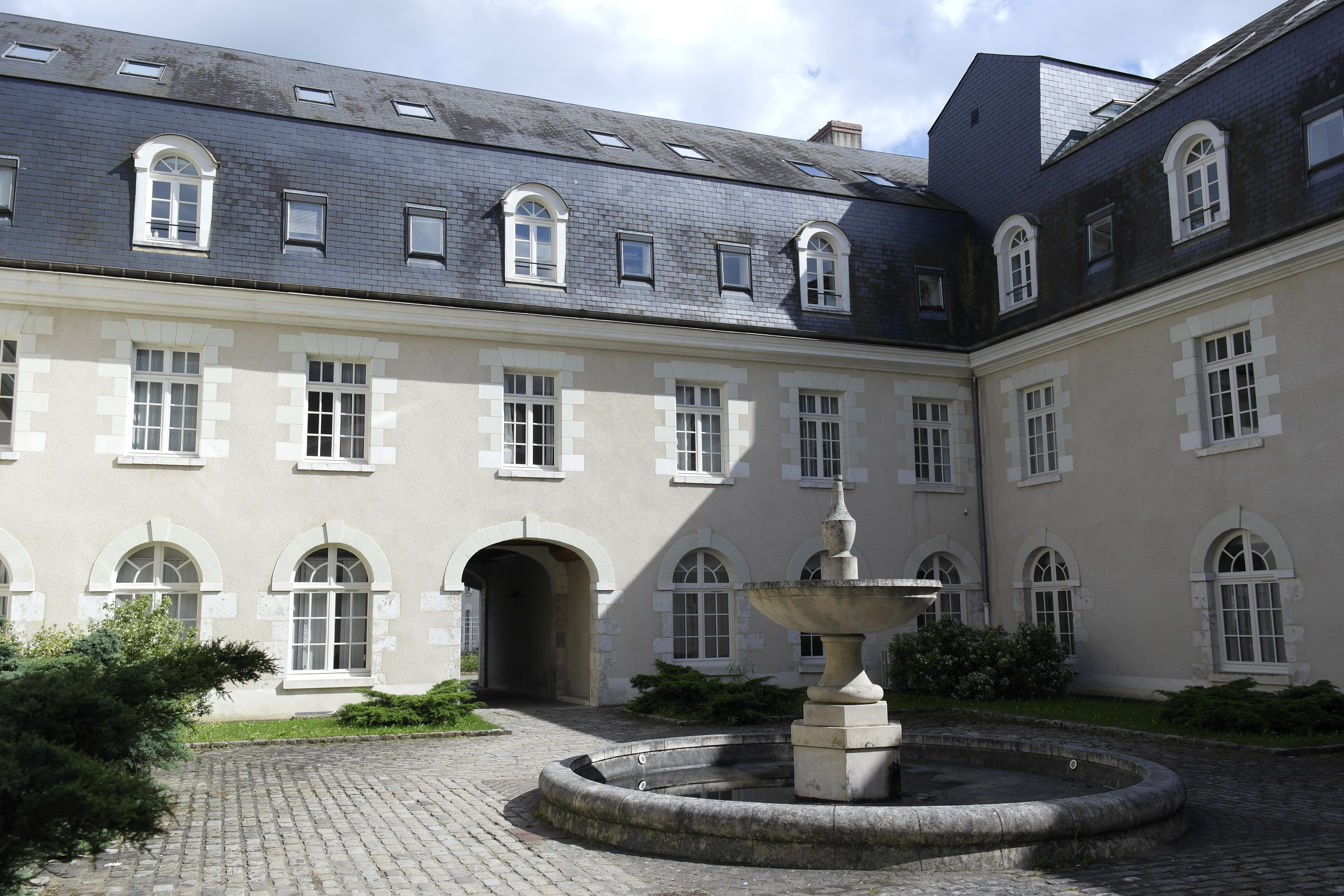
Main courtyard of the former asylum (south facade).

=== Expansion and fire ===
In 1852, the departmental asylum was expanded to include a large agricultural estate extending from Avenue de Paris (now Avenue Maunoury) to Chemin des Lions (now Rue Honoré-de-Balzac). The estate comprised a cowshed, pigsty, sheepfold, henhouse, stable, and cultivated fields, providing employment opportunities for patients and contributing to the institution's self-sufficiency in food production.

The asylum's development was temporarily interrupted by a fire on 13 August 1855, which originated in the attic of the men's quarters. The fire, controlled after two hours, caused damages estimated at 18,500 francs but resulted in no casualties. The facility was insured and fully restored by October of the same year.

=== Acquisition of the Villa Saint-Lazare ===
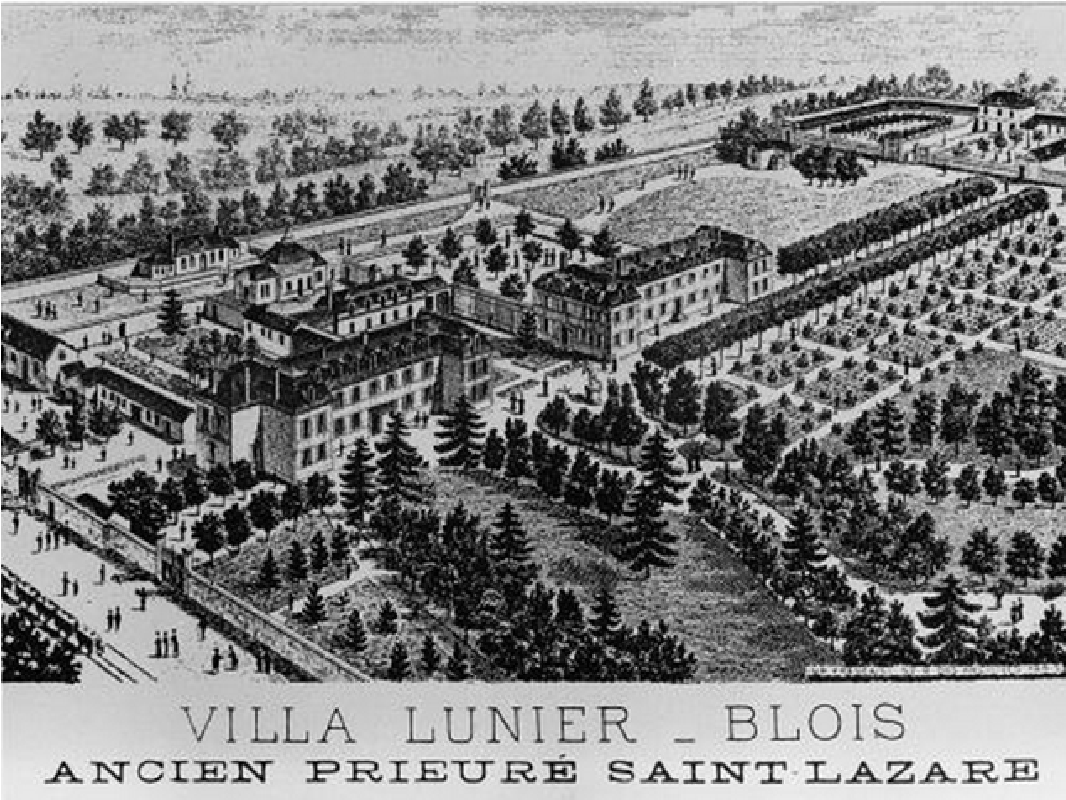
The Lunier hospice at the end of the 19th century. Engraving by L. Doutrebente.

In 1861, the departmental asylum was expanded following the acquisition by the Loir-et-Cher department of the Villa Saint-Lazare and its 11-hectare park, now part of the Robert-Badinter School Complex. Under the direction of Dr. Jules Lunier (1822–1884), the property was converted into a psychiatric clinic designed to accommodate affluent patients with nervous disorders.

Under the direction of architect Stanislas Beau, the Villa Saint-Lazare underwent extensive modifications beginning in 1872. To the east of the original building (now corresponding to the Hugo building of the current school complex), a second structure was constructed following the same plan and elevation as the Villa Saint-Lazare; this is now the Lunier building of the school complex. While the older villa was built with Beauce limestone and tuffeau, the new building employed Chauvigny stone and featured a different decorative style. Set slightly back from the two villas, a third, narrower building connected them, forming a symmetrical arrangement characteristic of 19th-century hospital architecture. Around 1970, this connecting building was demolished and replaced by the "Building J" of the school complex and its current dormitory.

Additional annex buildings were subsequently added to the main complex, including a thermal establishment located behind the central building and a series of pavilions distributed throughout the park. These brick-and-stone pavilions, covered with roofs featuring wooden eaves, were designed to isolate wealthier patients. Most were demolished during the 1970s, with only three surviving: "Les Tilleuls" (used for certain classes), "Les Glaïeuls" (now part of the Maison des Lycéens), and "Les Acacias" (used as staff housing).

Despite the integration of Villa Saint-Lazare into the departmental asylum, its park underwent only minor changes. It was expanded with an orchard and intersected by walkways to facilitate patient walks organized by Dr. Lunier.

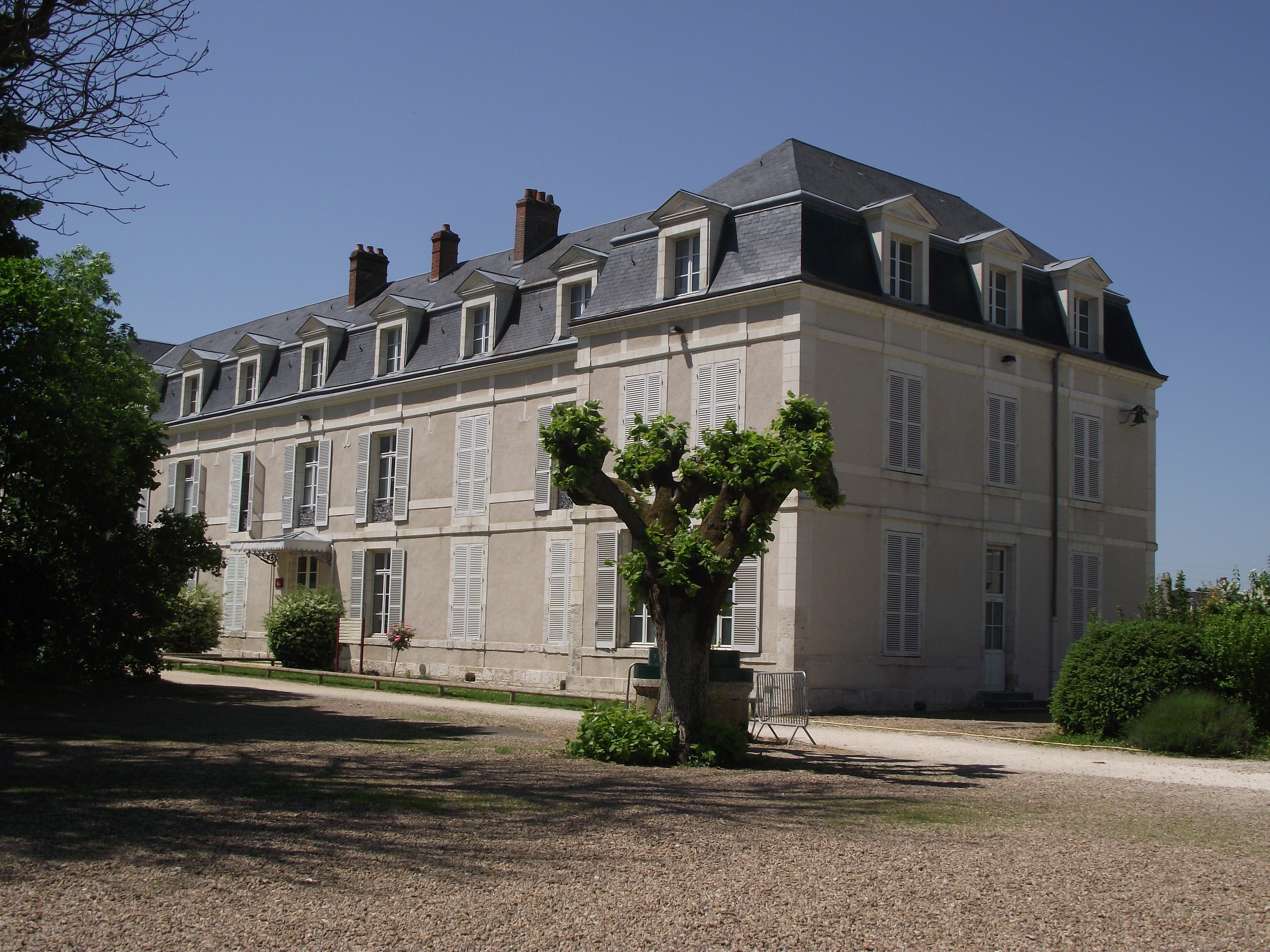
The Villa Saint-Lazare is now the Hugo building of the Robert-Badinter school complex.

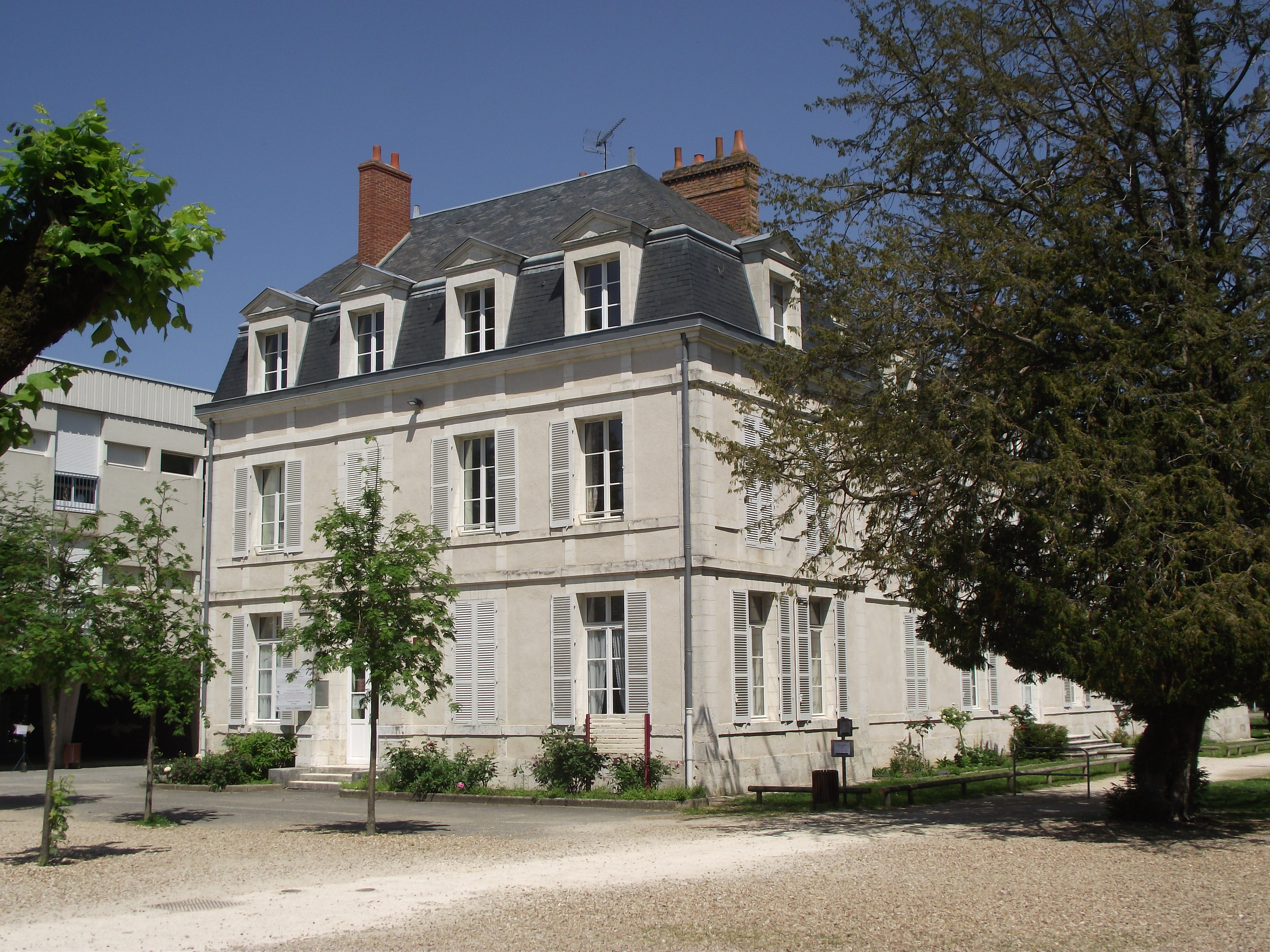
Villa Lunier now houses the school complex's administration offices.

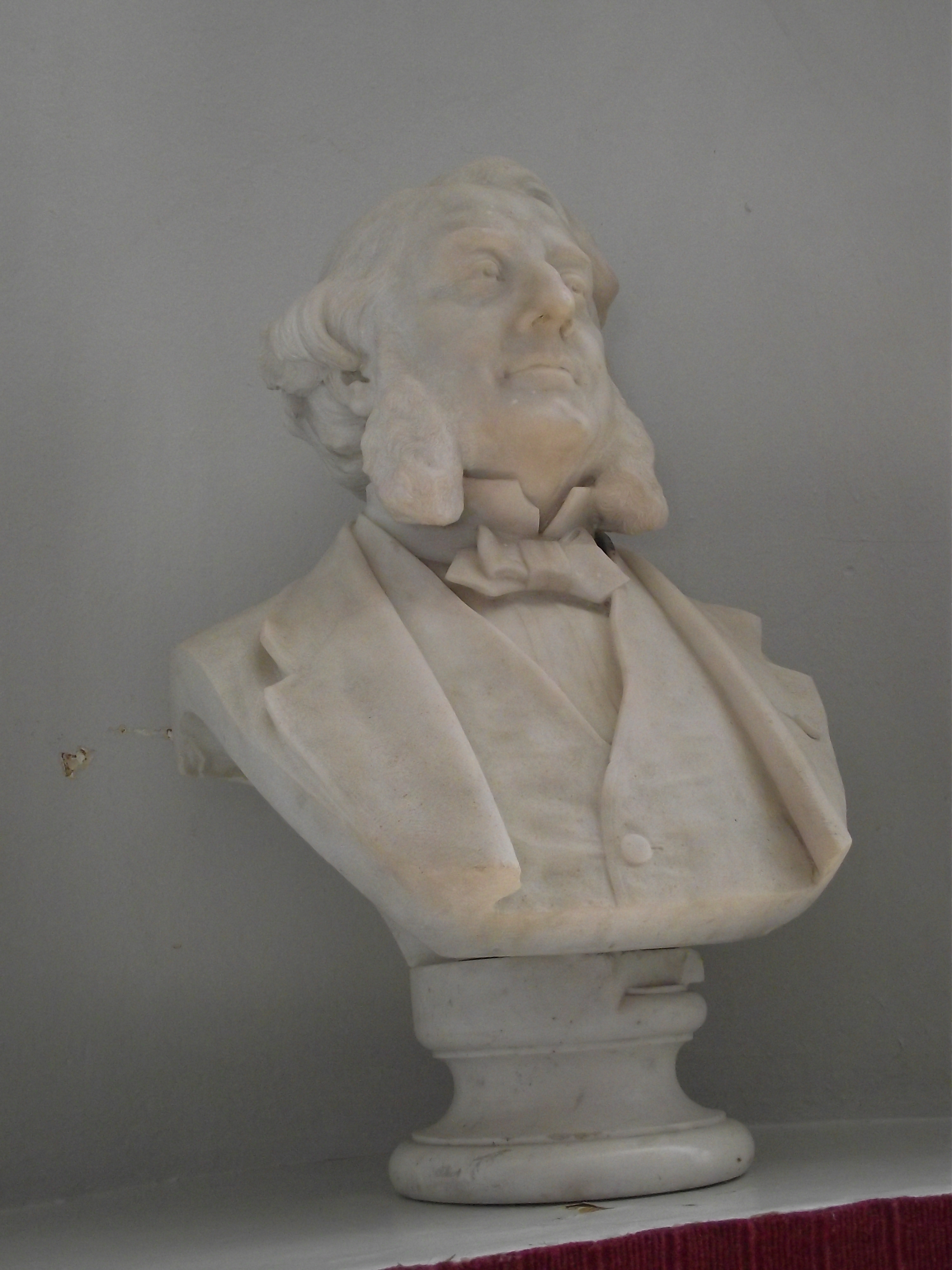
Bust of Dr. Jules Lunier by Louis Schrœder.

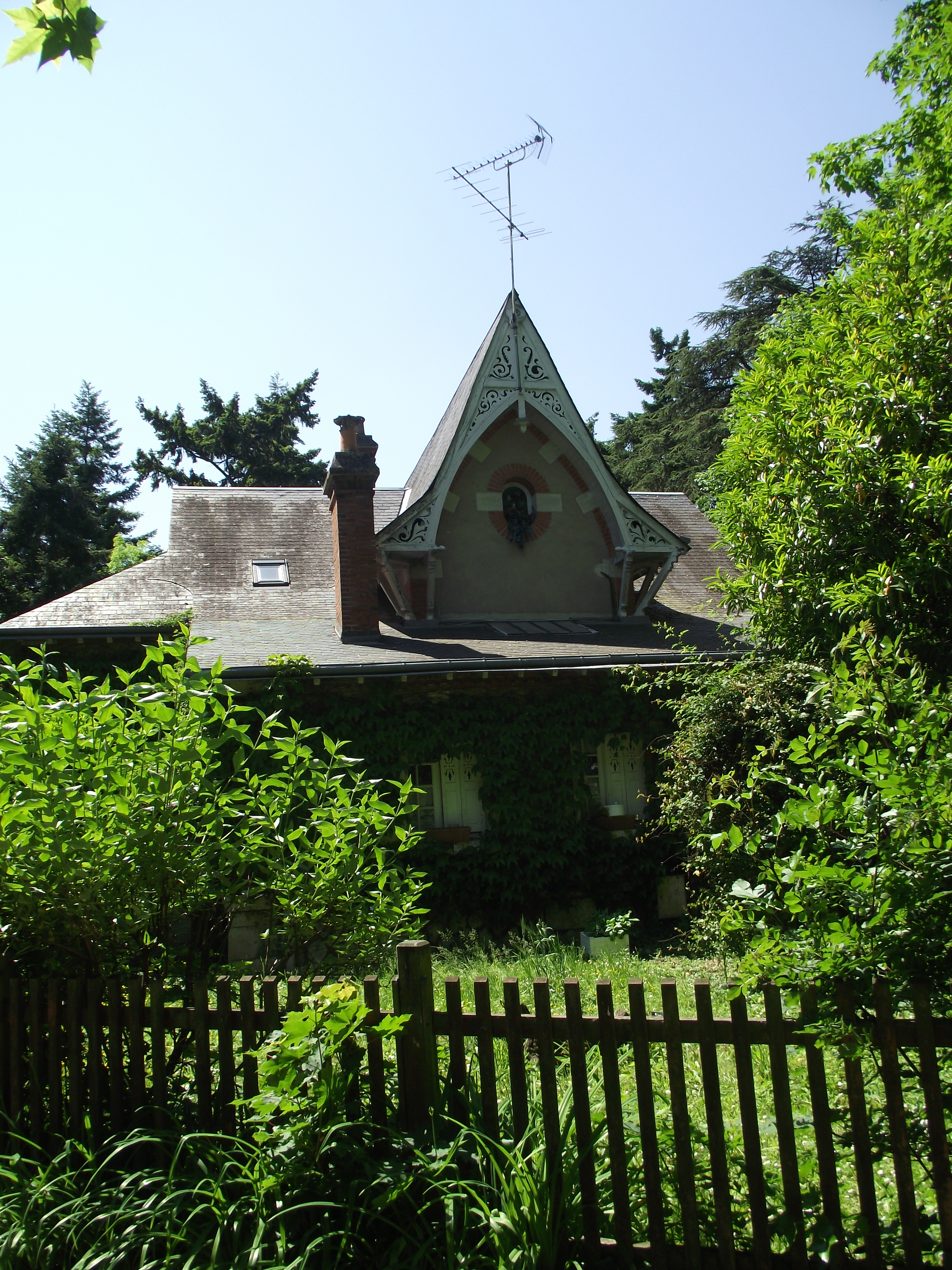
Originally intended for wealthy people with dementia, the villa "Les Acacias" is now the residence of the school complex's administrator.

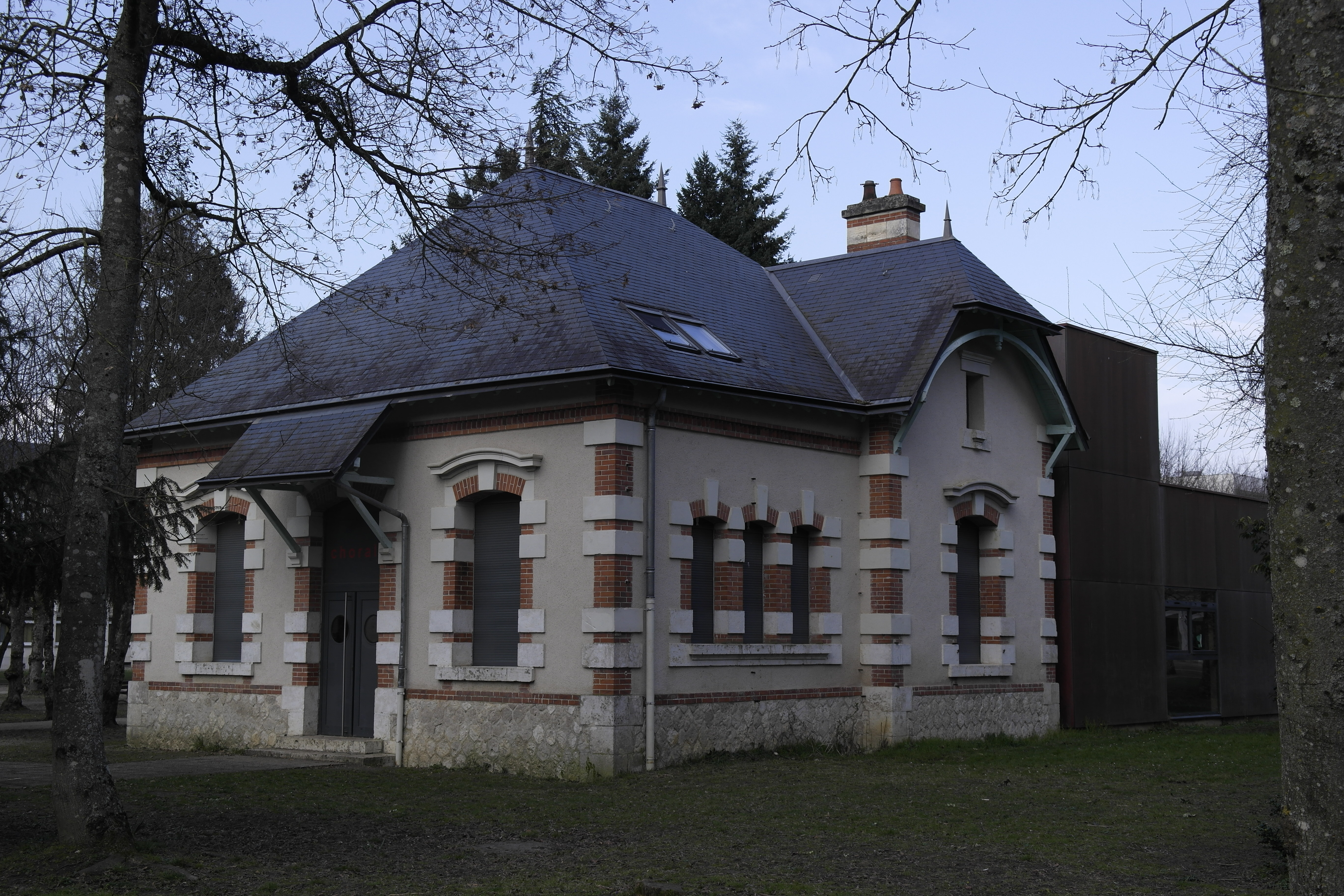
The villa "Les Glaïeuls" is now part of the Maison des Lycéens (High School Students' House).

=== New expansions ===
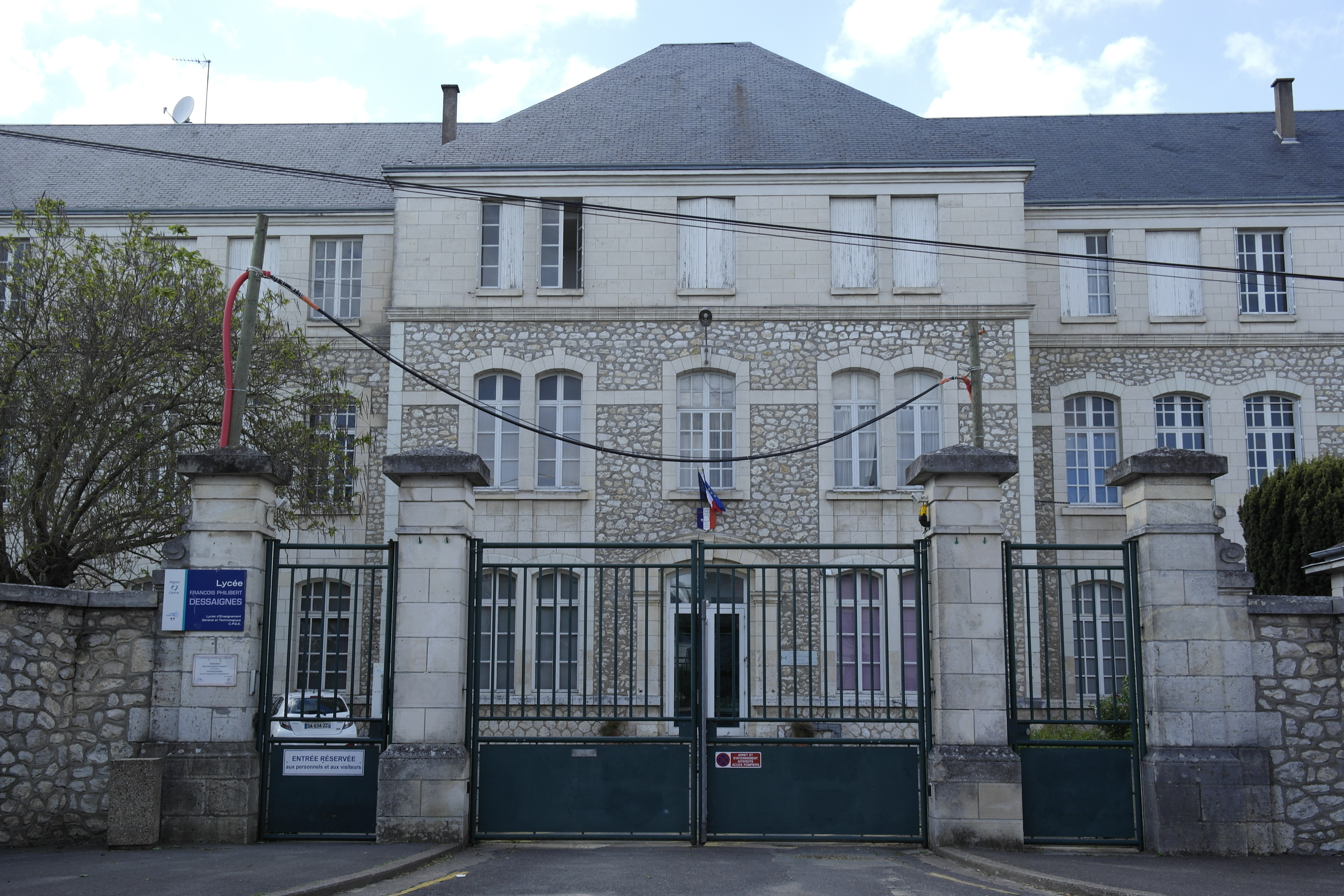
The Dessaignes hospice has been replaced by the high school of the same name (2015).

At the beginning of the 20th century, a significant bequest from the deputy and philanthropist François-Philibert Dessaignes allowed the new director, Dr. Gabriel Doutrebente (1844–1911), to expand the Loir-et-Cher Departmental Asylum. Three new buildings were constructed to accommodate and treat patients, including those with epilepsy, intellectual disabilities, and chronic illnesses. Inaugurated in 1907, the Dessaignes Hospice (currently part of the high school bearing the same name) housed elderly patients, including those who were senile or indigent.

During this period, the departmental asylum gained a strong reputation. According to La Revue médicale de l’Est, it achieved a recovery rate of over 50%, compared with a national average of approximately 5.2%.

Around 1910, Dr Joseph Ramadier expanded the departmental farm by acquiring additional agricultural estates, providing both land and occupational activities for patients of the asylum. With this expansion, the Loir-et-Cher Departmental Asylum occupied over 70 hectares in the northeast of Blois. By the eve of the Second World War, the institution accommodated approximately 1,100 patients and employed around 400 staff members, including nurses and agricultural workers.

=== Decommissioning and conversion ===
In 1940, during the German invasion of France, the departmental asylum was temporarily evacuated by French authorities but resumed operations one month after the signing of the armistice. During the Occupation, Dr. Pierre Schützenberger (1938–1943) concealed medical equipment from German forces, resulting in his imprisonment for several weeks between December 1942 and January 1943. The asylum was eventually decommissioned by order of the occupying authorities, with the tacit approval of the city of Blois, which had been significantly affected by wartime bombings. The remaining 561 patients were transferred to institutions in central and southwestern France, and the staff was permanently dismissed on 1 October 1943.

After the Second World War, the former estate of the departmental asylum underwent extensive redevelopment. The "departmental farm" was replaced by a residential district, the quartier des Provinces, and some of the park's pathways were converted into streets, including Avenue du Maréchal-Leclerc and Rue d’Auvergne. The Lunier Hospice and its gardens were repurposed as the Robert-Badinter International High School, while the Dessaignes Hospice became the high school of the same name. The main asylum buildings were converted into a departmental administrative center, with the former laundry on Rue d’Auvergne transformed into an administrative restaurant, the central kitchen on Rue Louis-Bodin repurposed for the departmental laboratory, and the farm buildings along Rue du Limousin allocated to various social services.

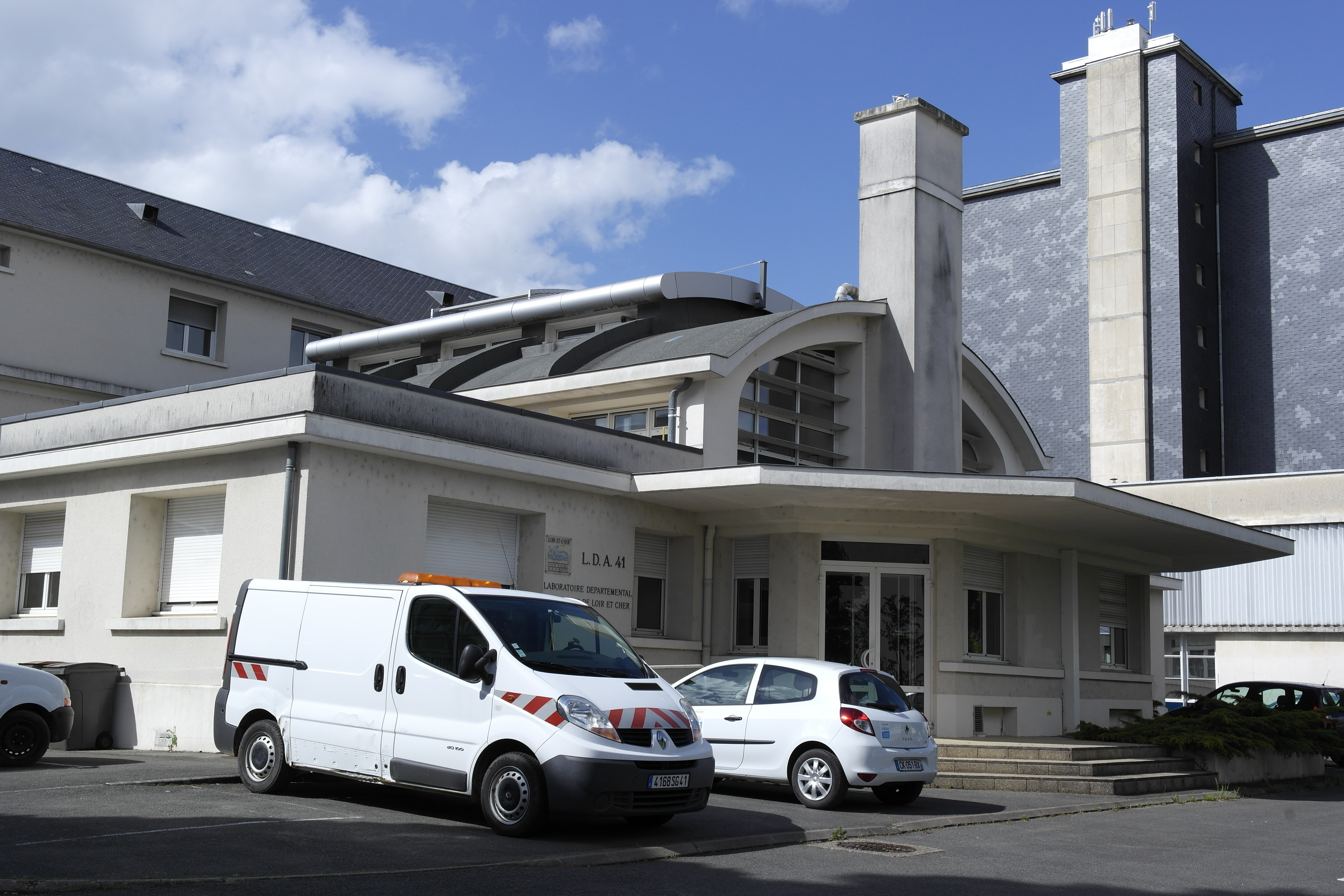
The current departmental laboratory housed the asylum's central kitchen.

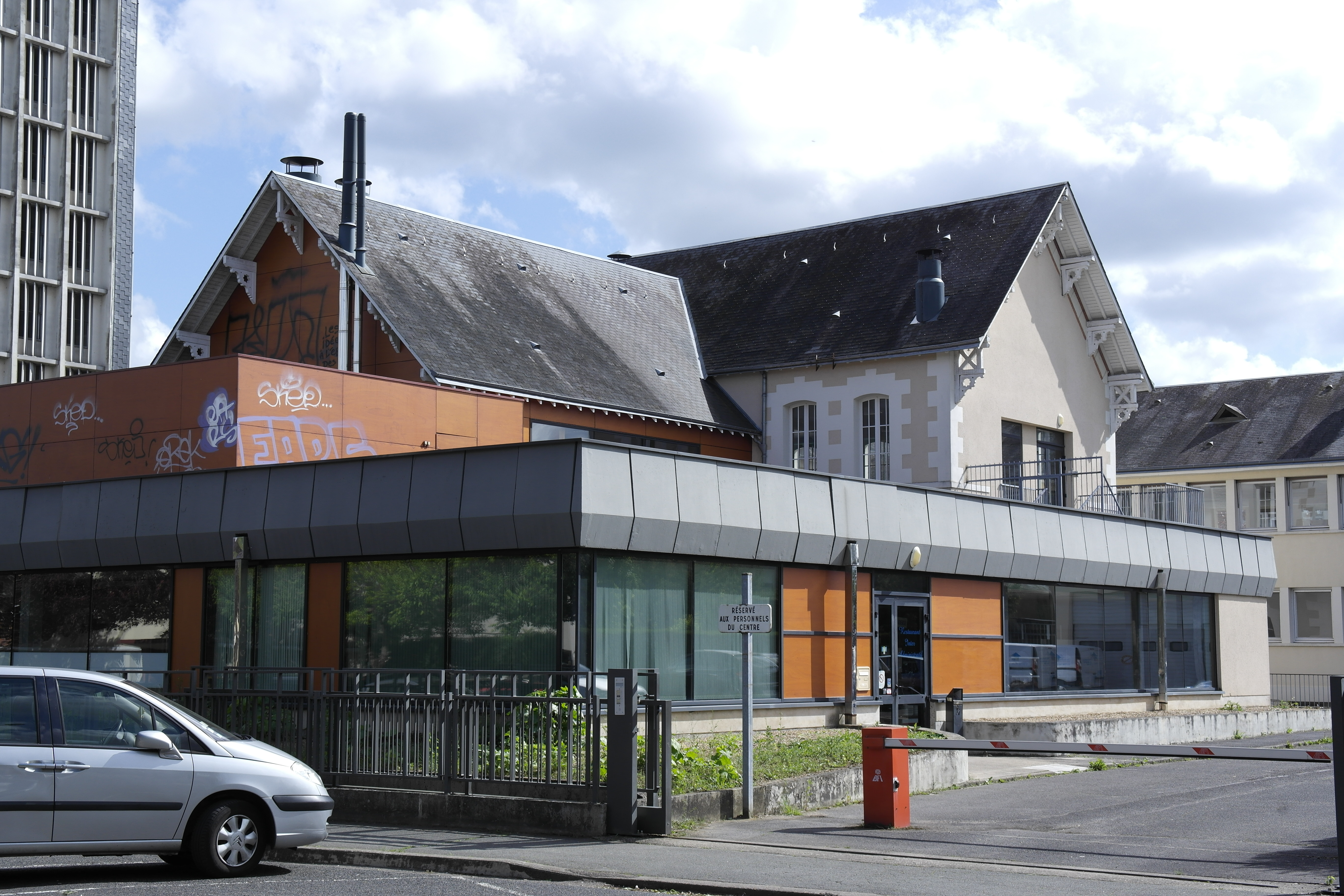
The current administrative restaurant housed the asylum's laundry room.

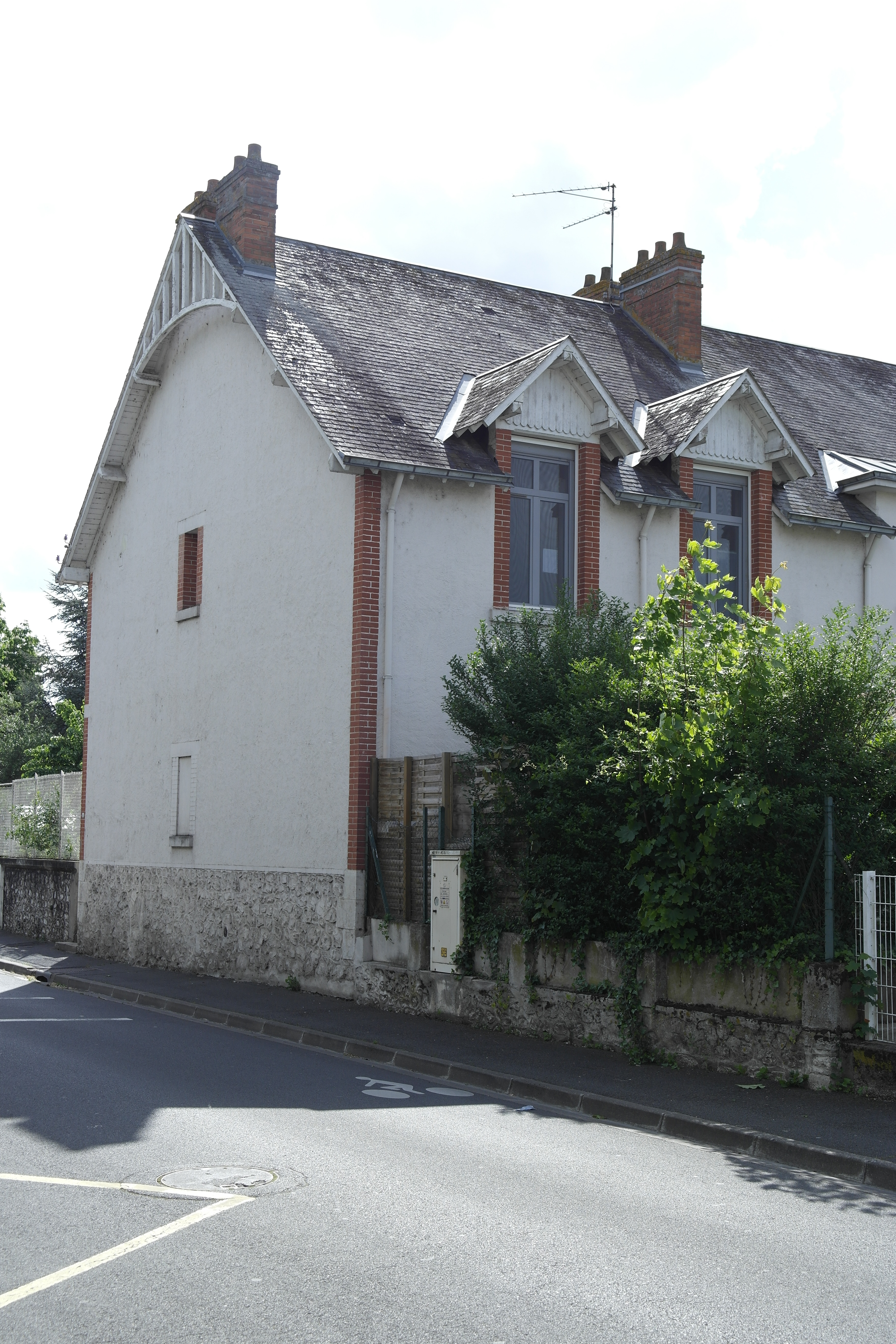
Former building linked to the departmental farm.

== Figures associated with the institution ==
=== Directors of the departmental asylum ===
- Dr Ernest Billod (1846–1858)
- Dr Jules Lunier (1858–1880)
- Dr Gabriel Doutrebente (1880–1906)
- Dr Joseph Ramadier (1906–1920) (Note: Dr. Joseph Ramadier is the father of Council President Paul Ramadier (1888–1961).)
- Dr Maurice Olivier (1920–1938) (Note: Dr. Maurice Olivier was also mayor of Blois from 1925 to 1940.)
- Dr Pierre Schützenberger (1938–1943) (Note: Dr. Pierre Schützenberger is the father of mathematician Marcel-Paul Schützenberger (1920–1996).)

=== Other members of the medical staff ===
- Dr Paul-Max Simon (1837–1889)
- Dr Henri Sterne (1893–1948)

=== Notable patients ===
- Blanche Monnier (1849–1913), known as La Séquestrée de Poitiers
- Ambroise Langlais (1866–1943), known as "Champalu," a famous vagabond of the Vendômois region
- Louis Lehmann, murderer responsible for a double homicide in 1898

== See also ==
- La Borde Clinic
- List of hospitals in France

== Bibliography ==
=== Thesis on psychiatric asylum ===
- Preel, Michel (1984). Histoire de la psychiatrie publique à Blois jusqu'en 1943 [History of public psychiatry in Blois until 1943] (Thesis) (in French). Paris: XII Créteil.

=== History and architecture of the hospice ===
- Cosperec, Annie (1997). "L'Actuel Lycée Augustin-Thierry : le prieuré et la villa Saint-Lazare, l'hospice Lunier" [The current Lycée Augustin-Thierry: the priory and the Villa Saint-Lazare, the Lunier hospice]. Mélanges offerts à Claude Leymarios (in French). C.D.P.A. 41: 71–77.
- Guignard, Bruno (2007). "Aliénés" [Insane]. Blois de A à Z [Blois from A to Z] (in French). Éditions Alan Sutton. pp. 7–12. ISBN 978-2849106211.
- Guignard, Bruno (2011). "Le centre administratif" [The administrative center]. Blois, la ville en ses quartiers [Blois, the city and its neighborhoods] (in French). Vol. 1. Éditions des Amis du Vieux Blois. p. 106. ISBN 978-2-9540052-0-1.

=== Notanle staff and patients of the hospice ===
- Audoux, Pascal (2015). "« La recluse de Poitiers », une vie enfermée à Blois" ["The recluse of Poitiers," a life confined to Blois]. Les Mystères du Loir-et-Cher [The Mysteries of Loir-et-Cher] (in French). Editions de Borée. pp. 318–337. ISBN 978-2812910951.
- Dreulle, Raymond (1986). "Un pittoresque personnage du Vendômois : Champalu" [A colorful character from the Vendôme region: Champalu]. Bulletin de la Société archéologique, scientifique et littéraire du Vendômois (in French): 102–103.
- Duchemin, Pierre (1997). "Une famille d'aliénistes tourangeaux au XIXe siècle : les docteurs Baillarger, Lunier et Doutrebente" [A family of mental health specialists in 19th-century Tours: Doctors Baillarger, Lunier, and Doutrebente]. Bulletin de la Société Archéologique de Touraine (in French). XLV: 229–238.
- Tiberghien, Denis (2018). "Pierre Schützenberger (1888–1973) : un aliéniste, expert dans l'affaire des sœurs Papin (Partie II)" [Pierre Schützenberger (1888–1973): a psychiatrist and expert witness in the Papin sisters case (Part II)]. Annales médico-psychologiques (in French). 176 (3): 310–323. doi:10.1016/j.amp.2017.10.009.

=== About Blois and Loir-et-Cher ===
- Cosperec, Annie (1994). Blois, la forme d'une ville [Blois, the shape of a city] (in French). Paris: L'Inventaire-Cahiers du patrimoine / Imprimerie nationale. ISBN 978-2-11-081322-0.
- Denis, Yves (1988). Histoire de Blois et de sa région [History of Blois and its region] (in French). Privat.
- Nourrisson, Pascal (2005). Blois : Le dictionnaire des noms de rues [Blois: The dictionary of street names] (in French). Chambray-lès-Tours: C.L.D. éditions. ISBN 978-2-85443-433-0.

=== Documentary ===
- Auger, Victor; Bahonda, Thérésa; Jeverdan, Audrey; Prévot, Louise; Ruiz, Émilie; Thiercelin, Leslie; Vieville, Claire; Vriet, Cément; Génard-Kalvarisky, Brigitte (2011). Rencontres silencieuses [Silent encounters] (in French). Centre images.
