= Loyer =

Loyer is a French surname. Notable people with the surname include:

- Emmanuelle Loyer (born 1968), French historian
- Erik Loyer, American digital artist
- Fletcher Loyer (born 2003), American basketball player
- John Loyer (born 1964), American basketball coach
- Roger Loyer (1907–1988), French motorcycle road racer
