= Prix du meilleur livre sur le théâtre du Syndicat de la critique =

The Prix du meilleur livre sur le théâtre du Syndicat de la critique is a French artistic award rewarding the best works on theater of the year.

== Palmares ==
- 1977/1978: Mettre en scène au présent by Raymonde Temkine, Éditions La Cité/Éditions L'Âge d'Homme
- 1978/1979: Panorama du théâtre au XXe siècle by Paul-Louis Mignon, Éditions Gallimard
- 1979/1980: Parti pris : Le théâtre depuis 1968 by Colette Godard, JC Lattès
- 1980/1981: Le Théâtre, ouvrage collectif, Éditions Bordas
- 1981/1982: Bertolt Brecht ou le petit contre le grand, by Georges Banu, Éditions Aubier-Montaigne
- 1982/1983: Avignon en festivals ou les Utopies nécessaires by Paul Puaux, Hachette
- 1983/1984: Le Théâtre, sorties de secours by Georges Banu, Aubier-Montaigne
- 1984/1985: Le masque : du rite au théâtre by the Équipe de recherches théâtrales du CNRS, CNRS Éditions-Odette Aslan
- 1985/1986: Deux siècles au Conservatoire national d'art dramatique by Monique Sueur, CNSAD
- 1986/1987: Jean-Marie Serreau, découvreur de théâtres by Élisabeth Auclaire-Tamaroff and Barthélémy, Éditions de l'Arbre verdoyant
- 1987/1988: Molière, Une vie by Alfred Simon, Éditions de la Manufacture
- 1988/1989: Le Théâtre en France, under the direction of Jacqueline de Jomaron, Armand Colin
- 1989/1990: Le Rouge et Or by Georges Banu, Flammarion
- 1990/1991: Meyerhold by Béatrice Picon-Vallin, CNRS Éditions
- 1991/1992: Le Théâtre dans les années-Vichy : 1940–1944 by Serge Added, Ramsay
- 1992/1993: Histoire du Théâtre dessinée by André Degaine, Nizet
- 1993/1994: Jacques Copeau by Paul-Louis Mignon, Julliard
- 1994/1995: Théâtre, reflet de la IVe République by Geneviève Latour, Éditions de la Bibliothèque de la Ville de Paris
- 1995/1996: Koltès, combats avec la scène, n°5 of Théâtres Aujourd'hui, CNDP, Centre national du théâtre
- 1996/1997: Les Lieux scéniques en France 1980–1995 by Jean Chollet and Marcel Freydefont, Éditions A.S.
- 1997/1998: La Comédie-Française sous l'Occupation by Marie-Agnès Joubert, Tallandier
- 1998/1999: Jean-Louis Barrault, le théâtre total by Paul-Louis Mignon, Éditions du Rocher
- 1999/2000: L'Ordre des morts by Claude Régy, Les Solitaires intempestifs
- 2000/2001: Œuvres complètes by Jean-Luc Lagarce, Les Solitaires intempestifs
- 2001/2002: L'Expression théâtrale (1944–1991) by Guy Dumur, Gallimard
- 2002/2003: Dictionnaire de la langue du théâtre by Agnès Pierron, Le Robert
- 2003/2004: Un siècle de critique dramatique by Chantal Meyer-Plantureux, Éditions Complexe
- 2004/2005: Théâtre aujourd'hui n°10 "L'ère de la mise en scène", Scéren/CNDP
- 2005/2006 : Qu'est-ce que le théâtre ? by Christian Biet and Christophe Triau, Folio-Gallimard
- 2006/2007: André Acquart, architecte de l'éphémère by Jean Chollet, Actes Sud
- 2007/2008: Histoire du Festival d'Avignon by Antoine de Baecque and Emmanuelle Loyer, Gallimard
- 2009/2010: Encyclopédie mondiale des arts de la marionnette collective work directed by Thieri Foulc, Éditions L'Entretemps
- 2010/2011: Les Utopies du masque sur les scènes européennes du XXe siècle by Guy Freixe, Éditions l'Entretemps
- 2011/2012: Dans le désordre (Actes Sud) and La Brûlure du monde, Les Solitaires intempestifs by Claude Régy
- 2012/2013: Politiques du spectateur : les enjeux du théâtre politique aujourd'hui by Olivier Neveux (La Découverte)
- 2013/2014: Armand Gatti dans le maquis des mots by Jean-Jacques Hocquard and Pauline Tanon, Actes Sud
- 2014/2015: Le théâtre du soleil, les cinquante premières années by Béatrice Picon-Vallin, Actes Sud
- 2015/2016: Le théâtre et la peur by Thomas Ostermeier, Actes Sud

== See also ==
- Prix du Syndicat de la critique
