= François Truffaut bibliography =

A list of books and essays written by and about François Truffaut:

- Baecque, Antoine de; Toubiana, Serge (1999). Truffaut. Knopf. ISBN 9780375400896.
- Dixon, Wheeler Winston (22 February 1993). Early Film Criticism of Francois Truffaut. Indiana University Press. ISBN 0-253-11343-1.
- Gillain, Anne (7 June 2013). François Truffaut: The Lost Secret. Indiana University Press. ISBN 0-253-00845-X.
- Insdorf, Annette (1994). François Truffaut. Cambridge University Press. ISBN 978-0-521-47808-3.
- Truffaut, François (1 January 2008). François Truffaut: Interviews. Univ. Press of Mississippi. ISBN 978-1-934110-14-0.
- Truffaut, Francois (21 July 2009). The Films In My Life. Da Capo Press. ISBN 0-7867-4972-5.
