= François I school complex =

French public education hub

François I School Complex
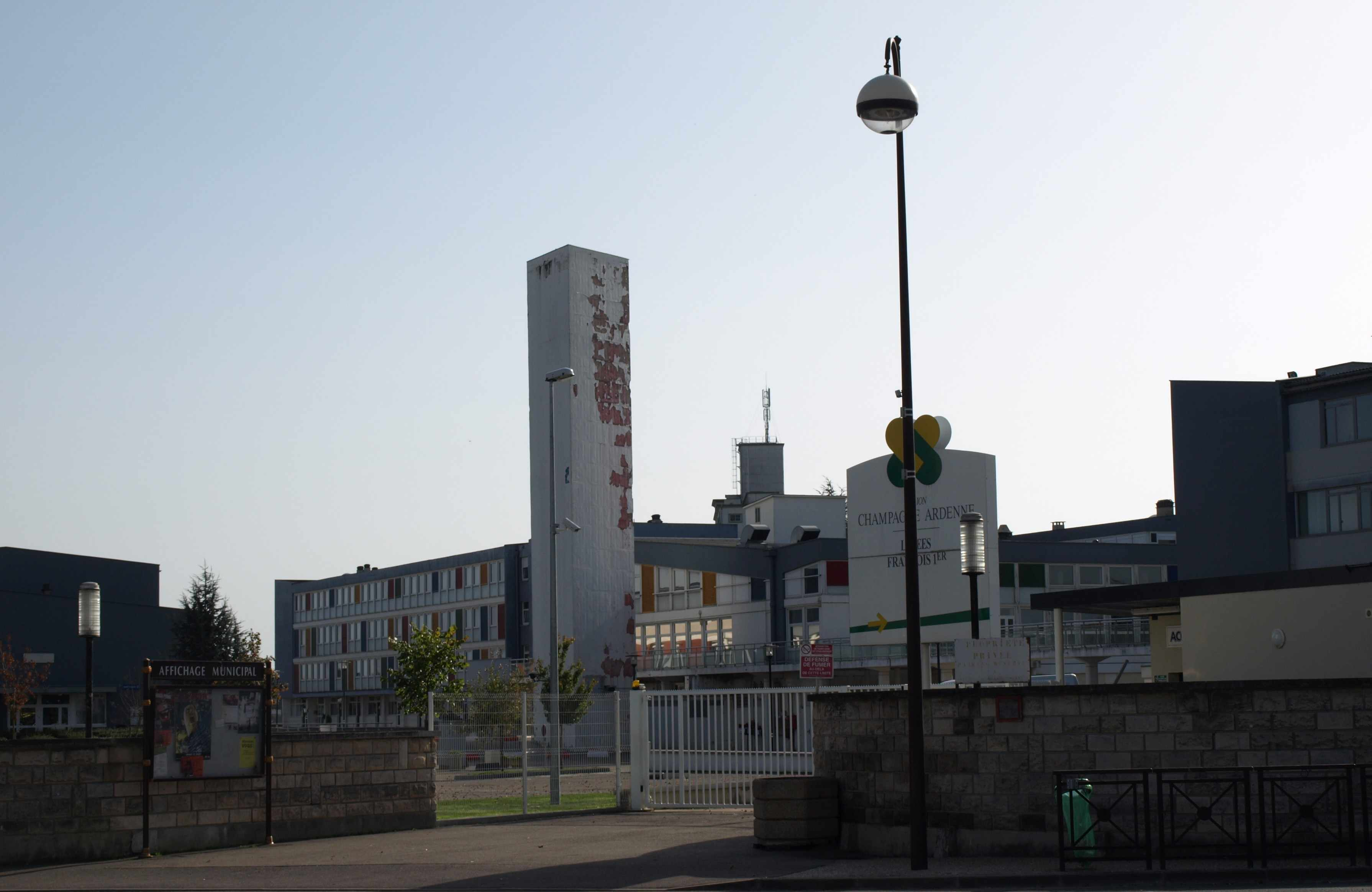

Location
- Vitry-le-François, France
- Coordinates: 48°43′43″N 4°35′48″E

Information
- Type: Public teaching
- Established: 1958
- School code: 0510062R
- Principal: David COGNAT

The François I school complex is a public education hub in Vitry-le-François (Marne), France, comprising two high schools—a general and technological high school and a vocational high school—a special integration mission class, BTS sections, and a GRETA. Before 1974, it also included a middle school, the Vieux-Port school.

== History ==
Since 1572, under the order of King Charles IX, the city of Vitry-le-François has hosted an educational institution located at the site now known as Place Royer-Collard. In 1710, new buildings were constructed to accommodate the growing institution. Following the French Revolution, the royal colleges were replaced in 1795 by the Écoles centrales, which were established in each departmental capital. In response to the requirement that students from Vitry-le-François travel to Châlons-en-Champagne for secondary education, local residents petitioned for the creation of a communal secondary school in the former royal college buildings. This school was officially established in 1812. Enrollment increased from 92 students in 1810 to 190 in 1858, reaching 236 by 1874. The facilities were progressively expanded to accommodate the growing student population. In October 1879, a secondary school for girls opened on Grande Rue de Vaux. The institution experienced rapid growth, with enrollment reaching 142 students in both 1917 and 1918, compared to 195 students enrolled in the boys’ school during the same period. Alongside the development of these public institutions, private schools, both secular and religious, continued to operate.

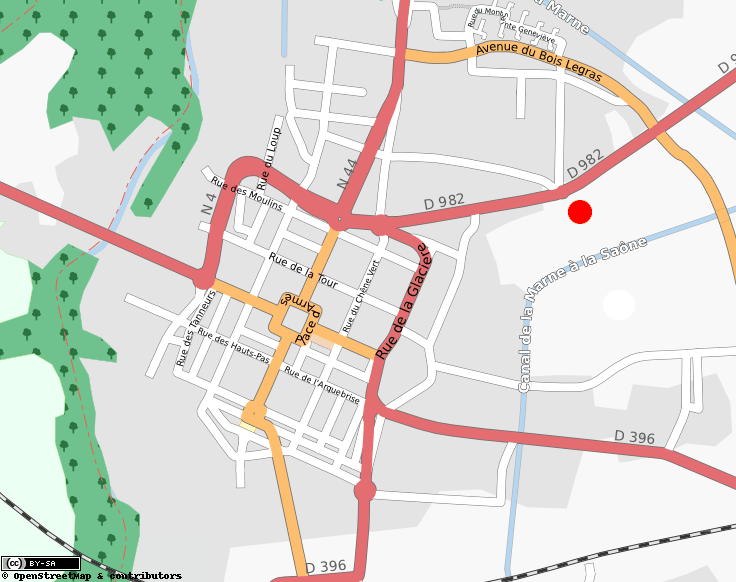
The commune of Vitry-le-François and the site of the François I school complex (red dot).

During World War II, aerial bombings caused extensive damage to Vitry-le-François, leaving only three municipal schools operational: Paul-Bert (Rue Sainte-Barbe), Jean-Macé (Boulevard François-Ier), and Ferdinand-Buisson (Avenue de la République). Classes resumed in August 1940, and temporary barracks were constructed to accommodate students. The Ministry of Defense leased the Dubois-Crancé district (now known as the Bords de Marne district) to the municipality, which used the site to establish several facilities, including a coeducational middle school. In 1942, under the initiative of Jules Hutin, the district also became home to the Centre d'éducation professionnelle et morale pour garçons (Center for Professional and Moral Education for Boys), which was later relocated to the La Fontaine Ludot area in the southern part of the city. In the postwar period, the city experienced significant population growth, prompting the construction of new educational infrastructure. The François-Ier school complex was initiated in 1958 but only completed in 1971, following a series of modifications. The extension of compulsory schooling to the age of 16, mandated by the order of January 6, 1959, led to the creation of two new middle schools: Les Indes (1970) and Marcel-Alin (1974).

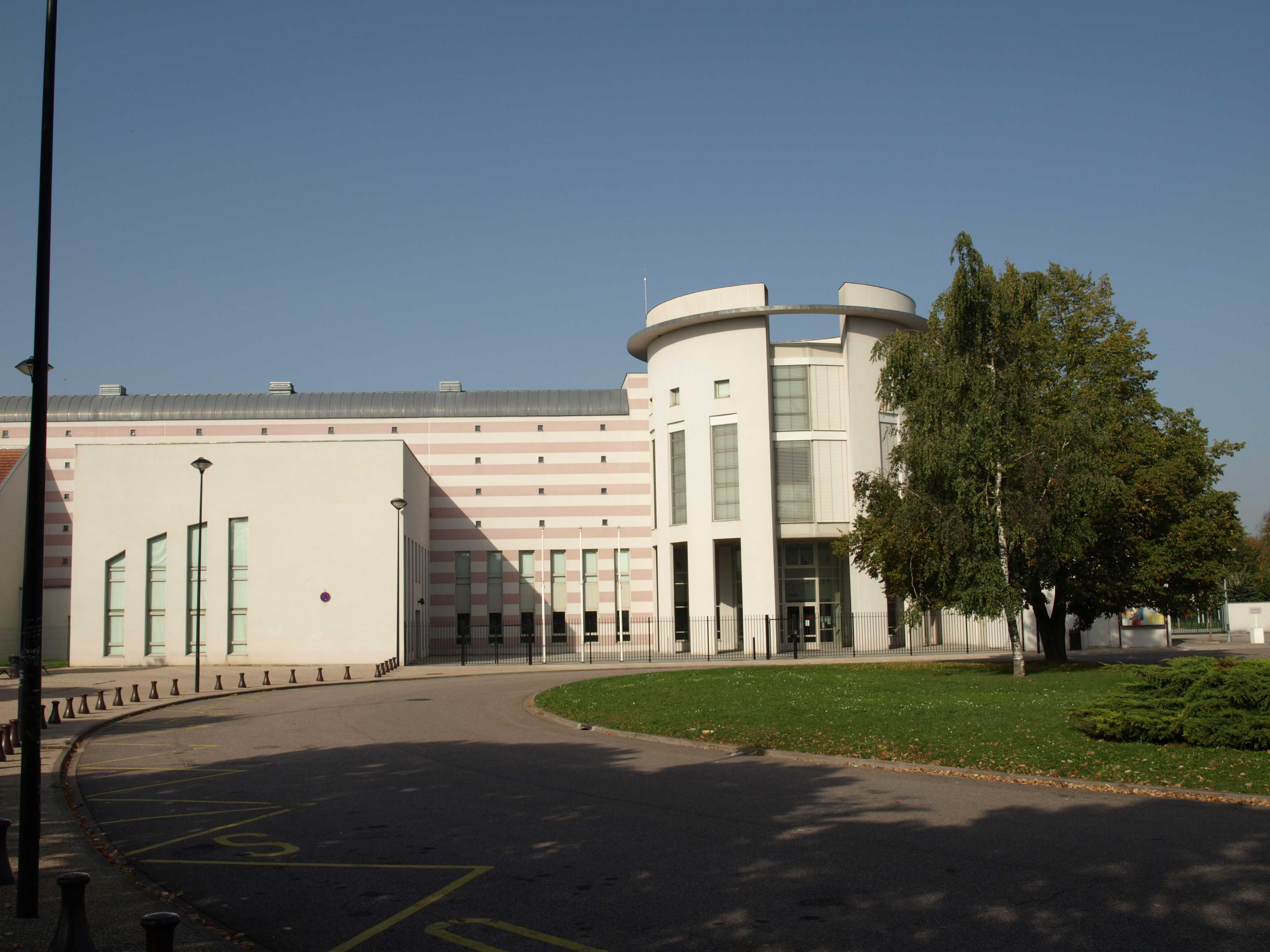
The front façade of the Collège les Indes, 1 Esplanade Tauberbischofsheim, 51300 Vitry-le-François.

== Situation ==
=== Academic ===
The François-Ier school complex is located in the Vitry-le-Brûlé district of Vitry-le-François, in the Marne department of northeastern France. It is one of the largest educational complexes in the Champagne-Ardenne region and covers an area of 14 hectares, or 36,000 square meters.

The complex is part of the Reims Academy and serves as the main educational hub for Vitry-le-François and its surrounding areas. It extends north to La Chaussée-sur-Marne, east to Sermaize-les-Bains, south to Sainte-Marie-du-Lac-Nuisement and Landricourt, and west to Saint-Ouen-Domprot.

Vitry-le-François, along with Saint-Dizier, is one of the two towns in the academy managing at least one sensitive urban zone (ZUS). In January 2004, the city was included among 22 zones selected nationwide by the French Ministry of the Interior for experimental initiatives aimed at reducing crime and violence.

=== Lycée rankings ===
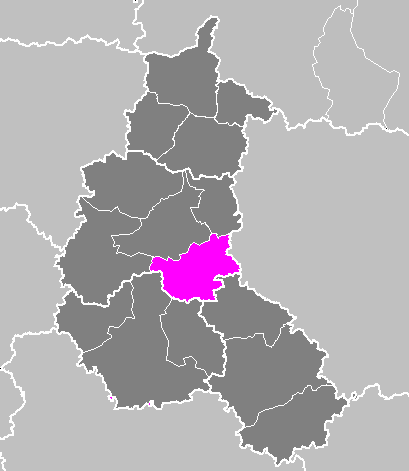
Vitry-le-François school district.

In 2015, the general and technological lycée within the François-Ier complex was ranked 7th out of 20 in the Marne department and 964th nationally, based on indicators of teaching quality. The ranking was determined by three main criteria: the success rate in the baccalauréat examination, the proportion of students who obtained their diploma after completing the final two years at the institution, and the "value added" indicator. This final measure accounts for the students’ social background, age, and previous academic performance, particularly in the national brevet examination.

=== Geographic ===
The François-Ier complex plays a central role in regional education, enrolling the majority of middle and high school students from Vitry-le-François and nearby communes. It is situated within an economically disadvantaged employment zone, a factor that has shaped both the demographic composition of the student body and the development of local education policies.

The complex is located approximately 500 meters from the YARA industrial site, within the Vitry-Marolles industrial zone to the east of the city. This facility is classified as a Seveso high-threshold site due to its large storage capacities of solid fertilizers. Although the school buildings are not located within the area officially covered by the Technological Risk Prevention Plan (PPRT), their proximity to the site has raised civil safety concerns.

=== Employment zone ===
The François-Ier school complex belongs to the inter-departmental and inter-academic employment zone known as the "triangle" (Vitry-le-François, Saint-Dizier, and Bar-le-Duc), which spans the Marne, Haute-Marne, and Meuse sectors. This employment zone includes the academies of Reims and Nancy-Metz. The school complex, particularly the combination of the general and technological lycée, the professional lycée, and the GRETA branch, is the only one of its kind within the training and administrative district.

=== Social climate ===
In 2006 and 2007, the area surrounding the François-Ier complex experienced what the gendarmerie described as a “notable deterioration in security,” based on statistical analyses. Rising levels of unemployment and low household incomes were cited as contributing factors to an increase in incidents such as assaults and extortion in the vicinity of the school.

== General architecture ==
=== Construction of the school complex ===
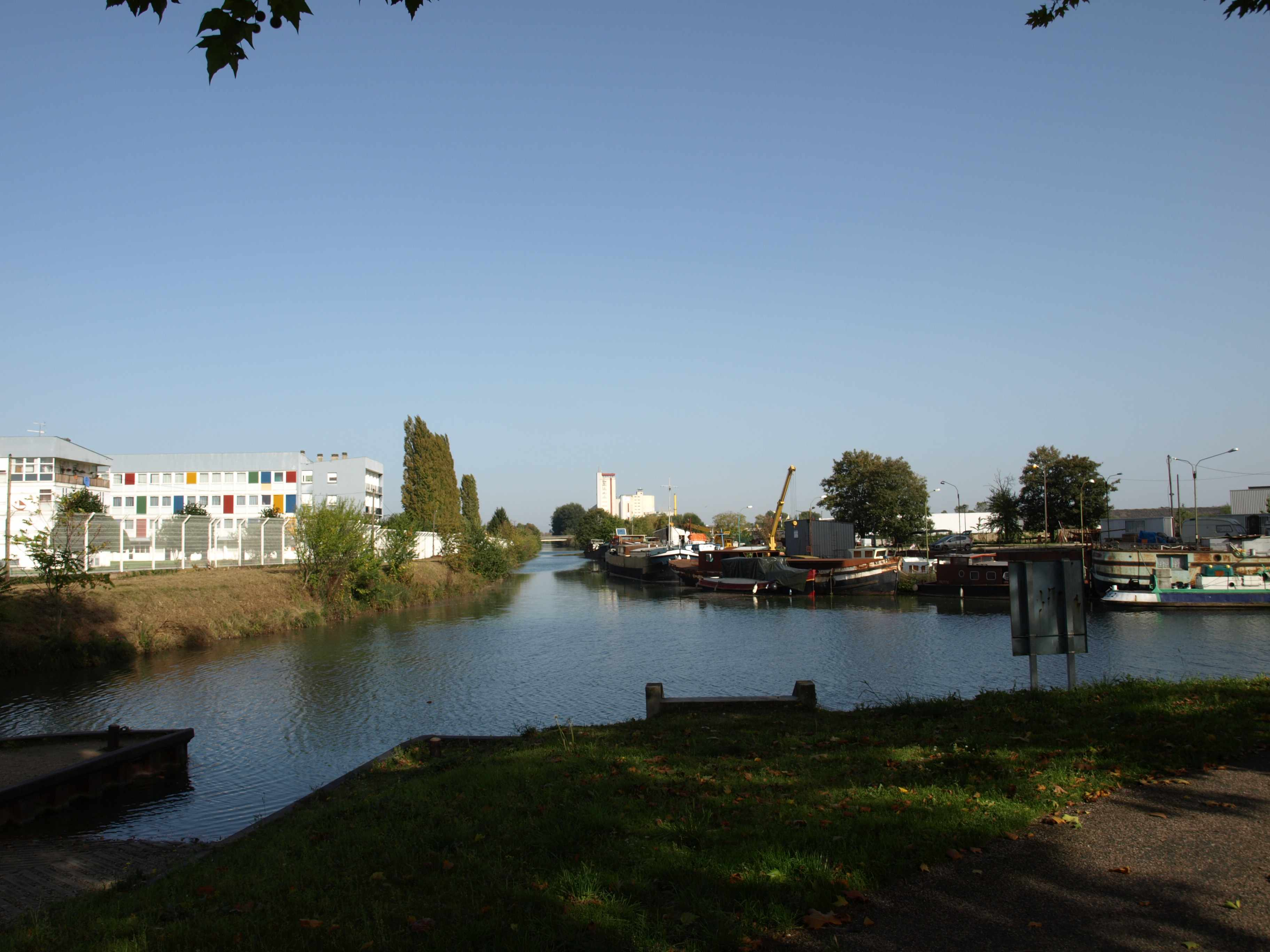
The school complex seen from the canal de la Marne à la Saône.

The foundation stone of the François-Ier school complex was laid in 1958, with the aim of consolidating the existing collège and two professional training centers. The official inauguration took place in October 1959, presided over by the Minister of State for Algerian Affairs, Louis Joxe. At the time, the complex comprised only the Doré building and enrolled approximately 550 students. In 1960, André Peuchot commented on the construction, stating: "The austere and venerable collège on Rue des Pères is succeeded by a modern establishment. Inaugurated on October 3, 1959, it is a vast, airy building, harmonious in its shapes and colors, adapted to the demands of a century where scientific and technical civilization is key to the future of younger generations." In September 1959, the first students were welcomed into the current Jacques-Doré building, which today is dedicated to science. On March 3, 1961, the Minister of National Education, M. Paye, and the High Commissioner for Youth and Sports, M. Maurice Herzog, visited the establishment.

Expansion of the complex continued throughout the 1960s. In 1962, three additional buildings were constructed: Rabelais (housing the kitchens and two cafeterias, one on the ground floor and the other on the upper floor), Henri Dunant (infirmary), and Diderot (girls' dormitory, with its first floor converted in 1978-1979 to host the documentation and information center). However, these buildings were not officially named until 1980, under the initiative of Principal Cachera and Administrator Bouchy. The complex was further expanded in 1964 with the addition of the boys' dormitory, named Abraham de Moivre. Temporarily, six prefabricated structures located between the Doré building and the Vitry-le-Brûlé district housed the women's technical education center. In 1968, the main part of the school complex was constructed: Montesquieu (administration), Colette (tertiary professional sections and general education), Marie Noël (temporarily hosting the girls' dormitory before returning it to Diderot), and Eiffel (professional sections for mechanics, electricity, and metalwork). The following year, the Unesco building was built to host the boys' dormitory, which was also relocated, along with classrooms for general education. The final building, Cugnot, was completed in 1971 to accommodate the automotive mechanics section. GRETA opened in 1974, following the July 16, 1971, law on continuing education.

In 1981, the state-run coeducational high school was renamed "Lycée François Ier" following a proposal from the school council and the issuance of a prefectural decree on October 8, 1981. It became a Local Public Education Institution (EPLE) in 1983 as a result of the first decentralization law.

=== Restructuring since 1991 ===
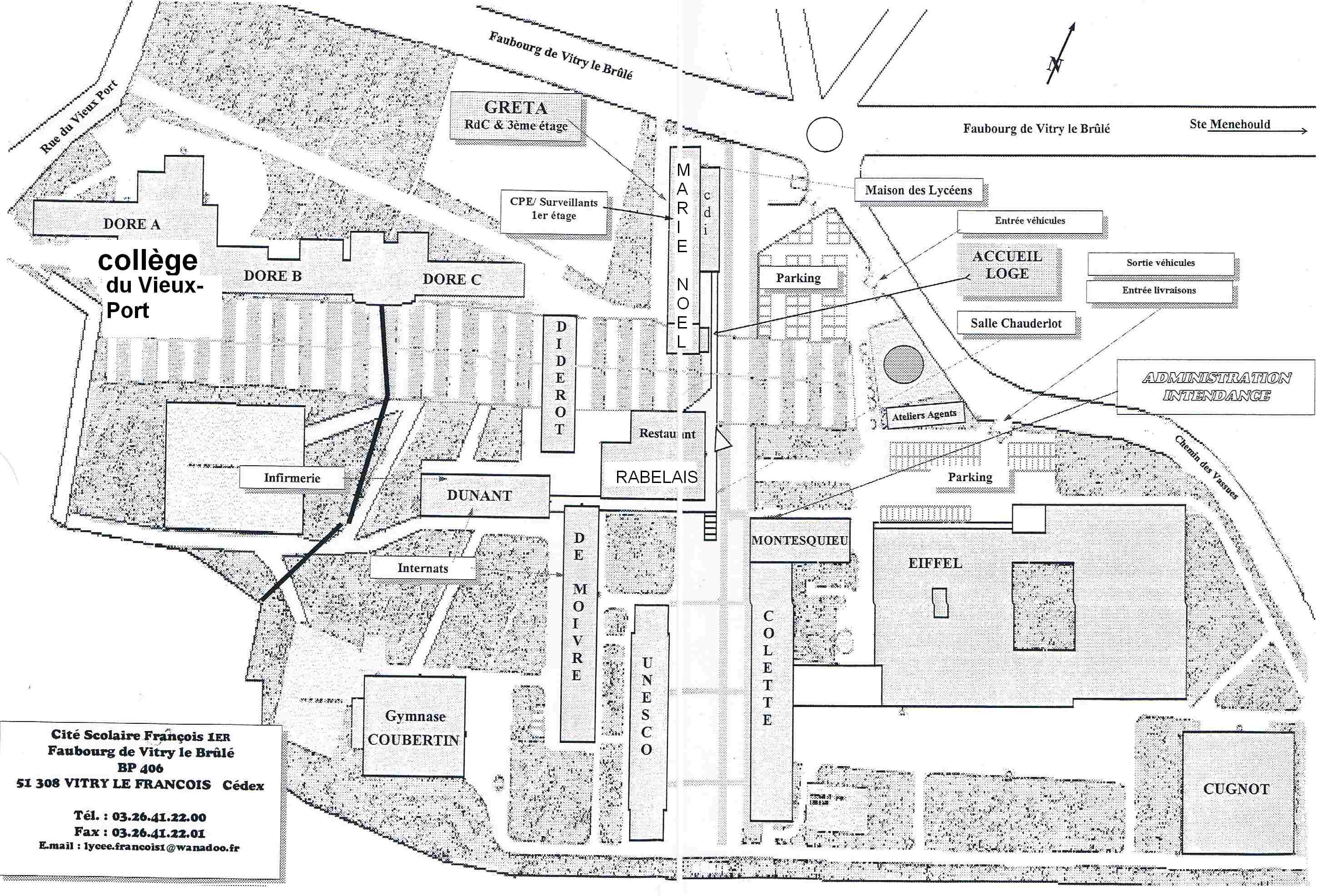
Current floor plan of the school complex.

The complex underwent a restructuring process from October 1991 (the date of the first consultation meeting) to September 1997 (the delivery of the Marie Noël building). However, construction did not begin until 1994 and faced several months of delays. An article in L'Union dated March 30, 1995, mentioned the "failures of the restructuring," which was initially scheduled to start on February 15 but eventually began in July under the administration of Principal Gérald Gervasoni. The first phase of work focused on the renovation of the Dunant dormitory. In 1996, the rehabilitation of the Vieux-Port middle school, which had been administratively autonomous since 1977 but shared some buildings with the high school, began for 21 million francs. The management of the school complex, facing a budget shortfall, secured an additional 2.1 million francs but still lacked approximately 15 million francs to complete the restructuring. New plans were proposed by Reims-based architect Jean-Michel Jacquet to address the financial shortfall and prevent further delays. These plans included connecting the Marie Noël and Rabelais buildings with a walkway and separating the middle school and high school spaces. The restructuring was finally completed in 1997.

Since the start of the 2010 school year, several construction projects have been initiated: the renovation of the kitchen tower, the refurbishment of the Colette building's façade, the insulation of classrooms in the Colette building, and the redesign of the cafeteria.

== Enrollment ==
In September 2010, the high schools welcomed 1,250 students, including 228 day students, 479 half-boarders, 40 boarders, and 800 trainees.

With the population of Vitry-le-François and its surrounding areas declining (1,200 fewer residents between 1999 and 2007 and 436 fewer between 2007 and 2008 in the arrondissement), the trend is moving toward closing classes and sections.

The school complex employs 290 staff members, including teachers, administrative staff, and ATOSS personnel.

== Teaching buildings ==
=== Collège du Vieux-Port ===
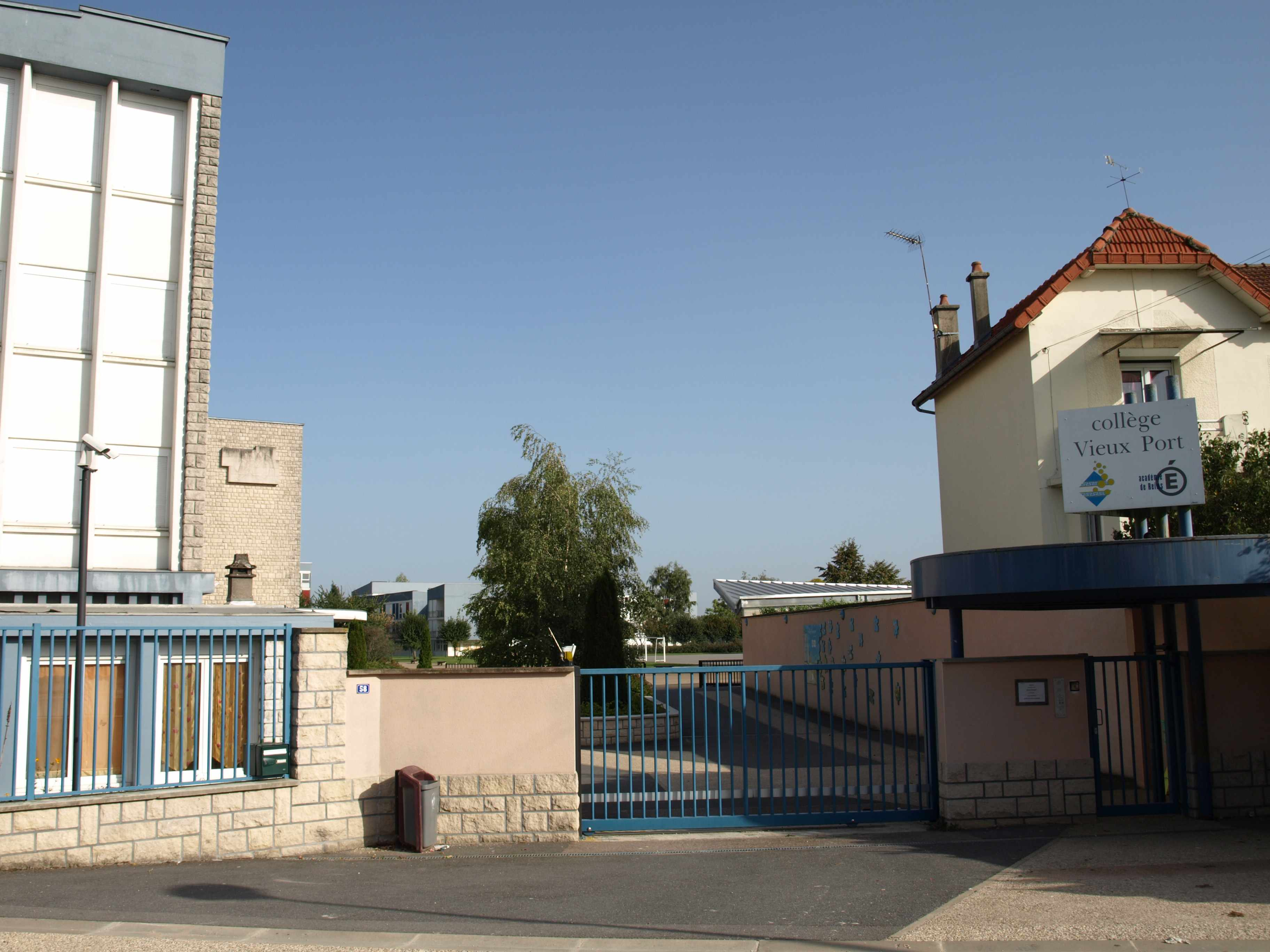
The college entrance.

In 1973, the first cycle of the coeducational state high school was transformed to create a Collège d'Enseignement Secondaire (CES). The CES was housed on the second floor of the Doré building. It became independent in 1977 and was subsequently named "Collège du Vieux Port." The collège accommodated 492 students in 2010.

The collège offers European sections. English is taught starting in sixth grade as the first foreign language (LV1 – 4 hours per week). In eighth grade, students can choose a second foreign language (LV2), either German or Spanish, with 3 hours of instruction per week. In ninth grade, two professional discovery options are available: one lasting 3 hours per week (DP3) and another lasting 6 hours per week (DP6). The collège also hosts an Integration Pedagogical Unit (UPI) for students facing cognitive learning difficulties. In 2009, the collège had an 85.3% success rate for the Diplôme National du Brevet.

=== High schools ===
==== General and technological high school ====
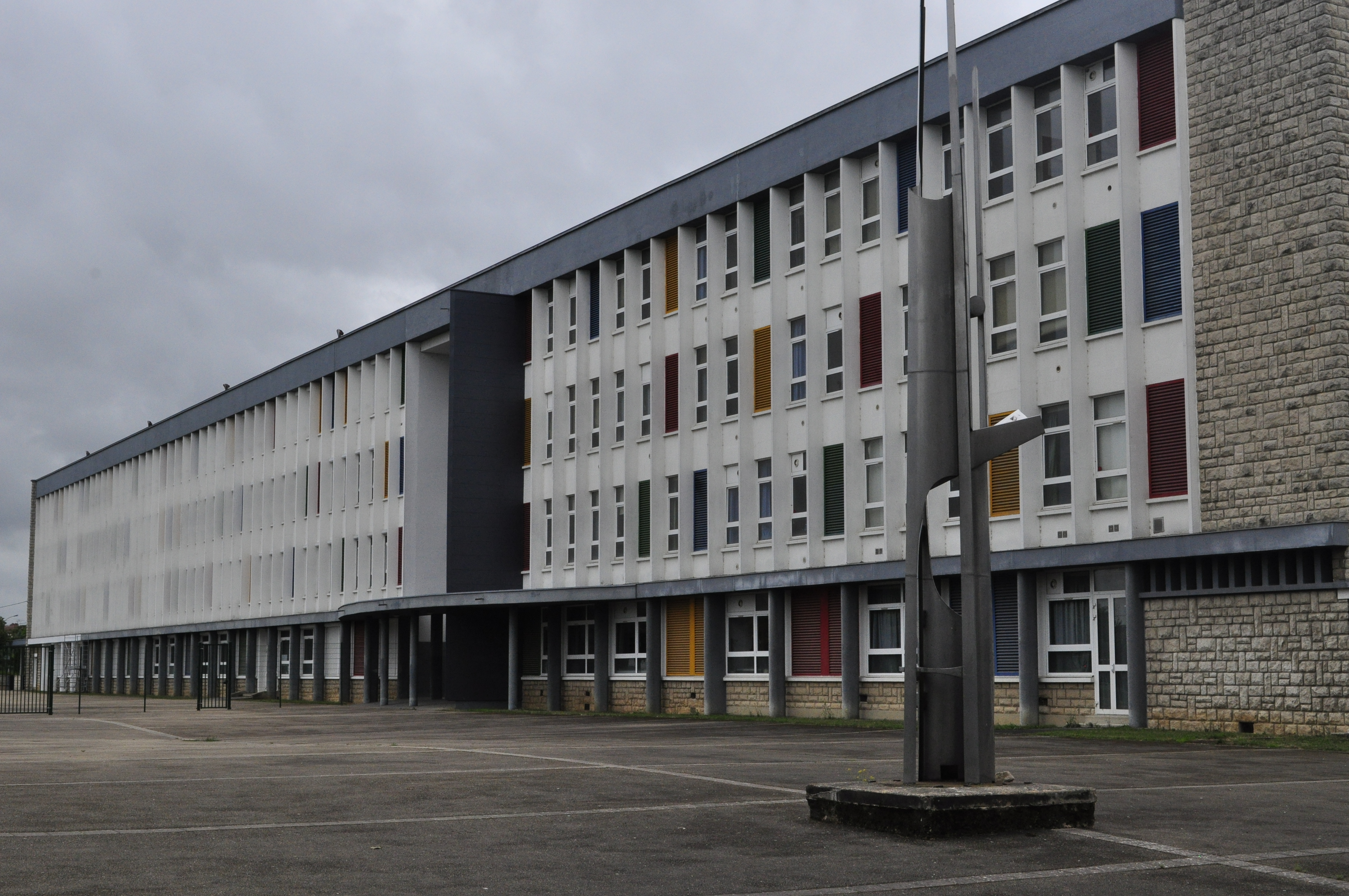
Doré building (middle and high school sections).

The courses for the general and technological high school are distributed across several buildings: Coubertin (named after Pierre de Coubertin, 1863–1937), which includes two gymnasiums, one of which is shared with the Collège du Vieux-Port; De Moivre (honoring mathematician Abraham De Moivre, 1667–1754, who studied in Vitry-le-François); Diderot (Denis Diderot, 1713–1784); Doré (named after Jacques Doré, an English teacher arrested and executed by the Germans in 1944), shared with the Collège du Vieux-Port; Dunant (Henri Dunant, 1828–1910, Nobel Peace Prize laureate in 1901); and Unesco (a reference to the civilizational work of UNESCO).

==== Vocational high school ====
The vocational high school is organized into three main buildings: Colette (in honor of the writer Colette, 1873–1954), which contains general education classrooms; Cugnot (named after Joseph Cugnot, 1725–1804, a brilliant engineer and inventor), dedicated to boiler making; and Eiffel (Gustave Eiffel, 1832–1923, in reference to metalwork), focused on mechanics, electricity, and metalworking.

The vocational high school was established in 1979 from the merger of two Technical Education Centers (CETs), which had been reclassified as Vocational High Schools (LEP) in 1977.

== Training programs ==
=== Initial training ===
==== Professional training ====
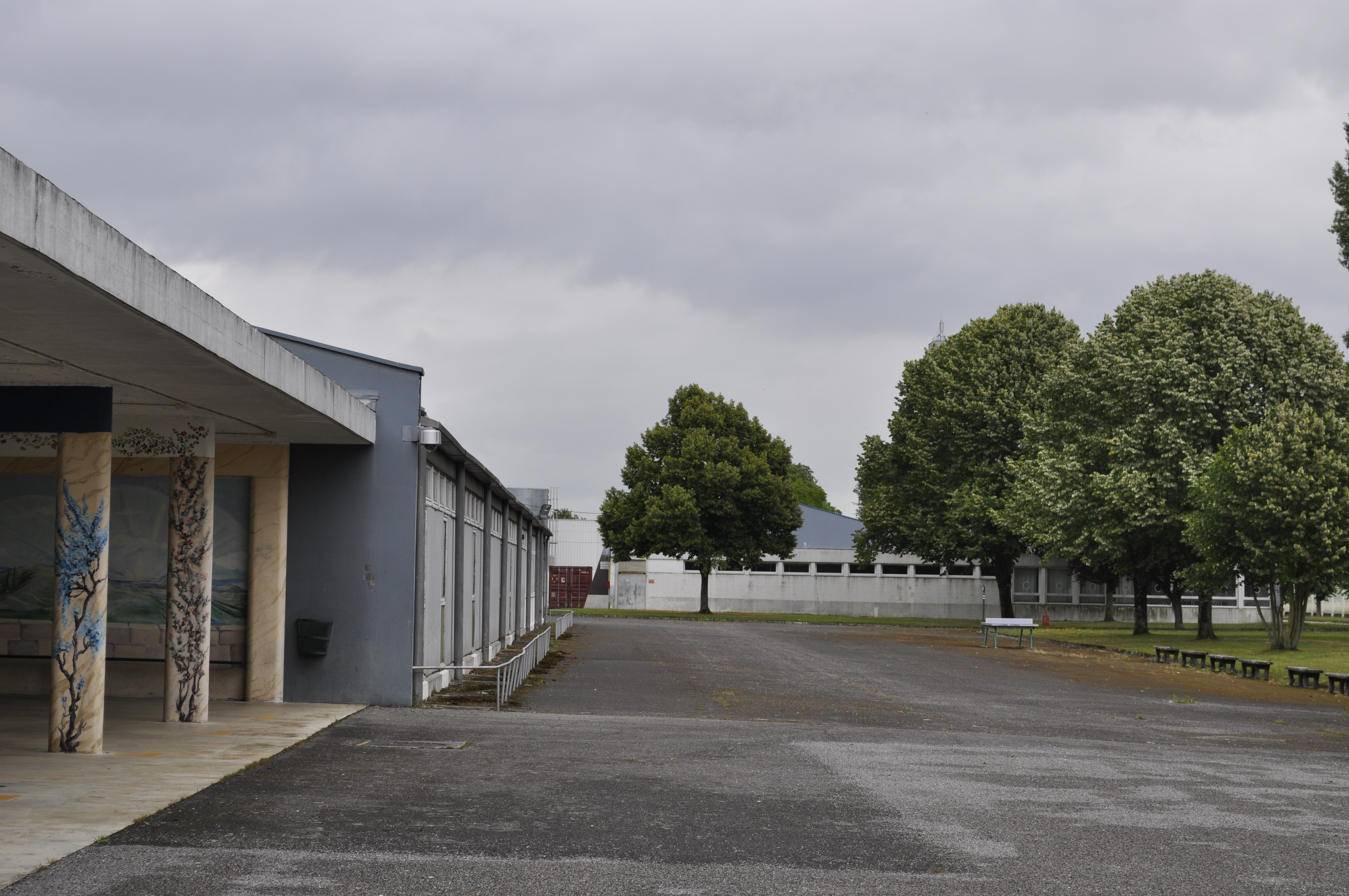
The Eiffel and Cugnot buildings, dedicated to vocational training.

The vocational high school offers five Vocational Training Certificates (CAP) and eight Professional Baccalaureates in industrial, tertiary, and service fields (personal care and fast food). Before the reform of the vocational track, the programs included seven BEPs, five Professional Baccalaureates, and four CAPs. François Ier Vocational High School is classified as a priority institution within the Reims Academy.

Following the renovation of the vocational track (two-year Professional Baccalaureate and two-year Vocational Training Certificate programs), the training courses provided at the school include:

Diploma Prepared	Name of the Program
Professional Baccalaureate	Electrotechnics, Energy, and Communicating Equipment
Professional Baccalaureate	Operation of Automated Production Systems
Professional Baccalaureate	Maintenance of Industrial Equipment
Professional Baccalaureate	Maintenance of Automotive Vehicles
Professional Baccalaureate	Accounting Professions
Professional Baccalaureate	Secretarial Professions
Professional Baccalaureate	Industrial Boilermaking Technician
Professional Baccalaureate	Sales (Prospecting, Negotiation, Client Follow-up)
Certificate of Professional Aptitude (CAP)	Multi-Skilled Catering Agent
Certificate of Professional Aptitude (CAP)	Technical Assistant in Family and Collective Environments
Certificate of Professional Aptitude (CAP)	Preparation and Execution of Electrical Works
Certificate of Professional Aptitude (CAP)	Painter and Coating Applicator

==== General and technological programs ====
The general and technological high school prepares students for general and technological baccalaureates. The second-year curriculum includes many exploratory subjects to choose from: Technological Creation and Innovation, Latin, Literature and Society, Scientific Methods and Practices, Fundamental Principles of Economics and Management, Engineering Sciences, Economic and Social Sciences, and Science Laboratory Studies. The school also emphasizes language development through two European sections, in German and English, which prepare students for various language certifications.

Diploma Prepared	Name of the Program
General Baccalaureate	Literature
General Baccalaureate	Economics and Social Sciences
General Baccalaureate	Life and Earth Sciences; Engineering Sciences
Technological Baccalaureate	Science and Technology of Industry and Sustainable Development
Technological Baccalaureate	Science and Technology of Management and Administration

The school complex opened its first Advanced Technician Certificate (BTS) program in 1985, titled Industrial Computing. It was followed in 1990 by a BTS in Mechanics and, in 1992, by a BTS in Commercial Action (Assistant for SME-SMI Management). The BTS IRIS (Computing and Networks for Industry and Services) is also offered. The current BTS programs available at the school complex are:

Diploma Prepared	Name of the Program
Higher Technical Certificate (BTS)	Mechanics and Industrial Automation
Higher Technical Certificate (BTS)	Computer Science and Networks for Industry and Technical Services
Higher Technical Certificate (BTS)	SME–SMI Management Assistant

=== Continuing education ===
The school complex hosts a GRETA called "Pays Champenois," established in 1974. It offers personalized pedagogy workshops focused on written and oral expression, math skills, and professional orientation.

== Administration ==
=== Organization ===
Since 2014, the school complex has been under the leadership of Principal M. Recoque, who succeeded M. Philippe Hanen. The administrative buildings are Montesquieu (named after Montesquieu, 1689–1755, a French writer) and Marie Noël (Marie Noël, 1883–1967, a French poet). Two deputy principals, one for the vocational school and one for the general and technological high school, report to the principal. They are assisted by four Principal Education Advisors (CPEs), supported by five school success mediators and 14 supervisory staff responsible for student life. Two department heads manage material and human resources, as well as internships and relationships with businesses. The financial services handle staff management, public procurement, budgeting, cafeteria and boarding operations, internships, school trips, and routine administrative tasks.

The school operates continuously from Monday to Friday, 8:00 AM to 6:00 PM. Its organization as a single school complex allows for integrating general services, cost-saving economies of scale, and resource sharing (cultural space, library, student services). This setup facilitates extensive interdepartmental collaboration, strengthening the orientation system. The school's information management (student database, student life, internships, etc.) is handled through the Sconet (Schooling on the Internet) environment. School records are managed using the Campus software.

=== Governance ===
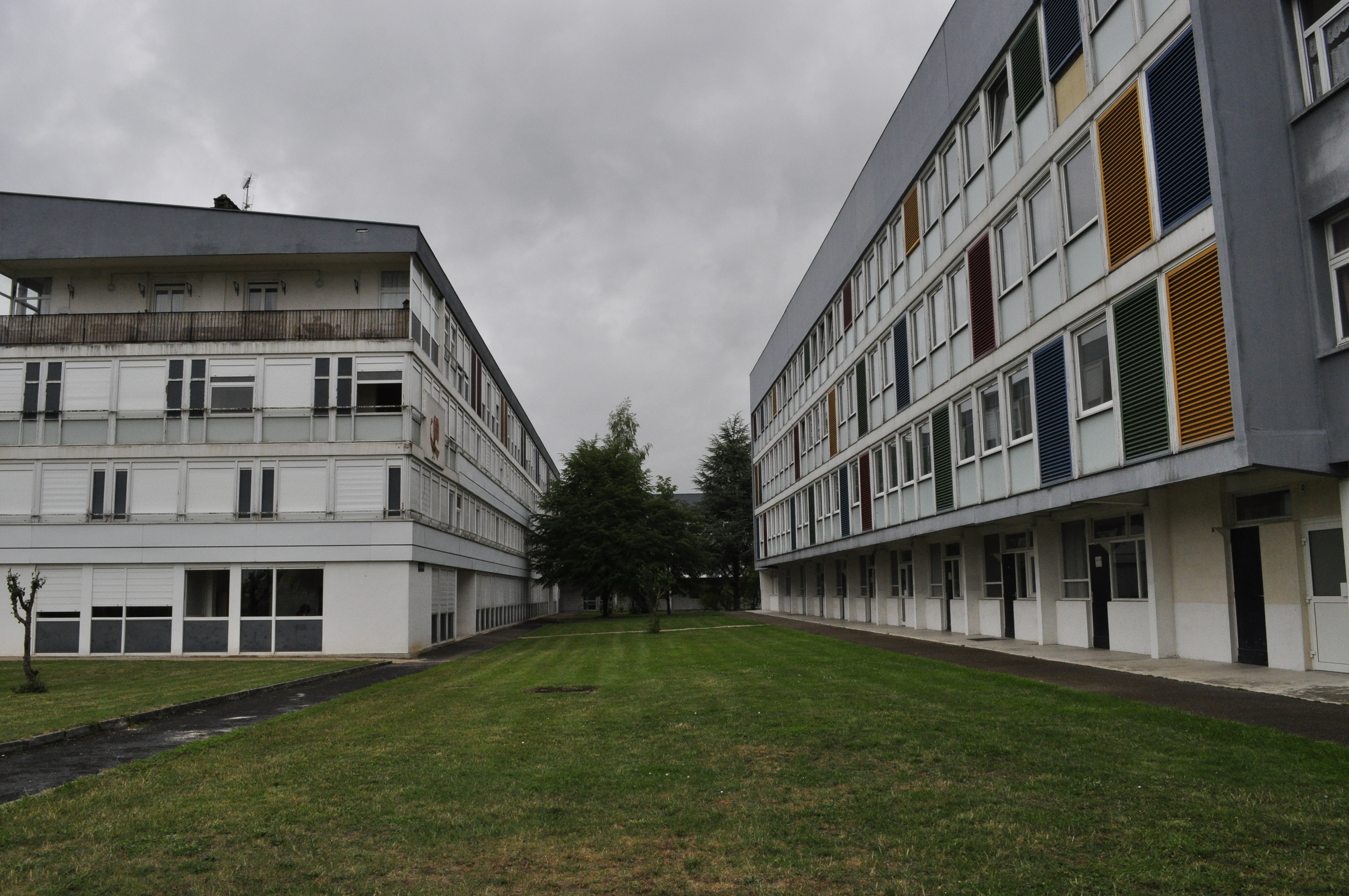
The Unesco building (right), which houses the general education department, and the De Moivre building (left), which houses the boarding school.

The school complex is governed by a Board of Directors that deliberates on matters of budgeting, internal regulations, field trips, health, and safety. For serious disciplinary cases, the Disciplinary Council has the authority to impose all penalties outlined in the internal regulations; it is chaired by the principal. François Ier also has a Health and Citizenship Education Committee (CESC), established in 1990, aimed at supporting actors involved in combating social exclusion in coordination with the school. The committee works to reduce school failure rates, improve relationships with families, and prevent risky behaviors and violence. Additionally, a Hygiene and Safety Committee (CHS) reports to the Board of Directors on the safety and hygiene status of the school complex.

The school's institutional project seeks to enhance student representation within its administration. As a result, there is a General Assembly of Student Delegates (AGDE), composed of the principal, a CPE, and all class and dormitory delegates. This assembly meets at least twice a year to discuss issues related to school life and academics. It also elects five members to represent all students on the Board of Directors and three in the Student Life Council.

=== Institutional project ===
The school development plan includes six areas for improvement. The chosen educational approaches are twofold. For the general high school: increasing promotion rates from 10th to 11th grade and establishing connections with local middle schools. For the vocational high school: improving support for students facing difficulties and expanding access to industrial vocational baccalaureate programs. Both high schools are also tasked with developing an industrial project. Concerning cultural life, the school prioritizes giving students opportunities to attend theater performances in collaboration with local cultural partners (La Salamandre and L'Orange Bleue). Regarding living conditions, the main focus is participation in environmental protection initiatives. For guidance and school life, the goals are to strengthen ties with families, enhance the quality of information provided about career guidance, and reduce absenteeism. The priorities concerning citizenship, health, and prevention aim to foster and promote civic engagement initiatives and to increase student involvement within their representative bodies. Finally, the development plan seeks to further transform the school complex into a true community hub and to encourage the growth of student clubs.

=== Boarding and dining ===
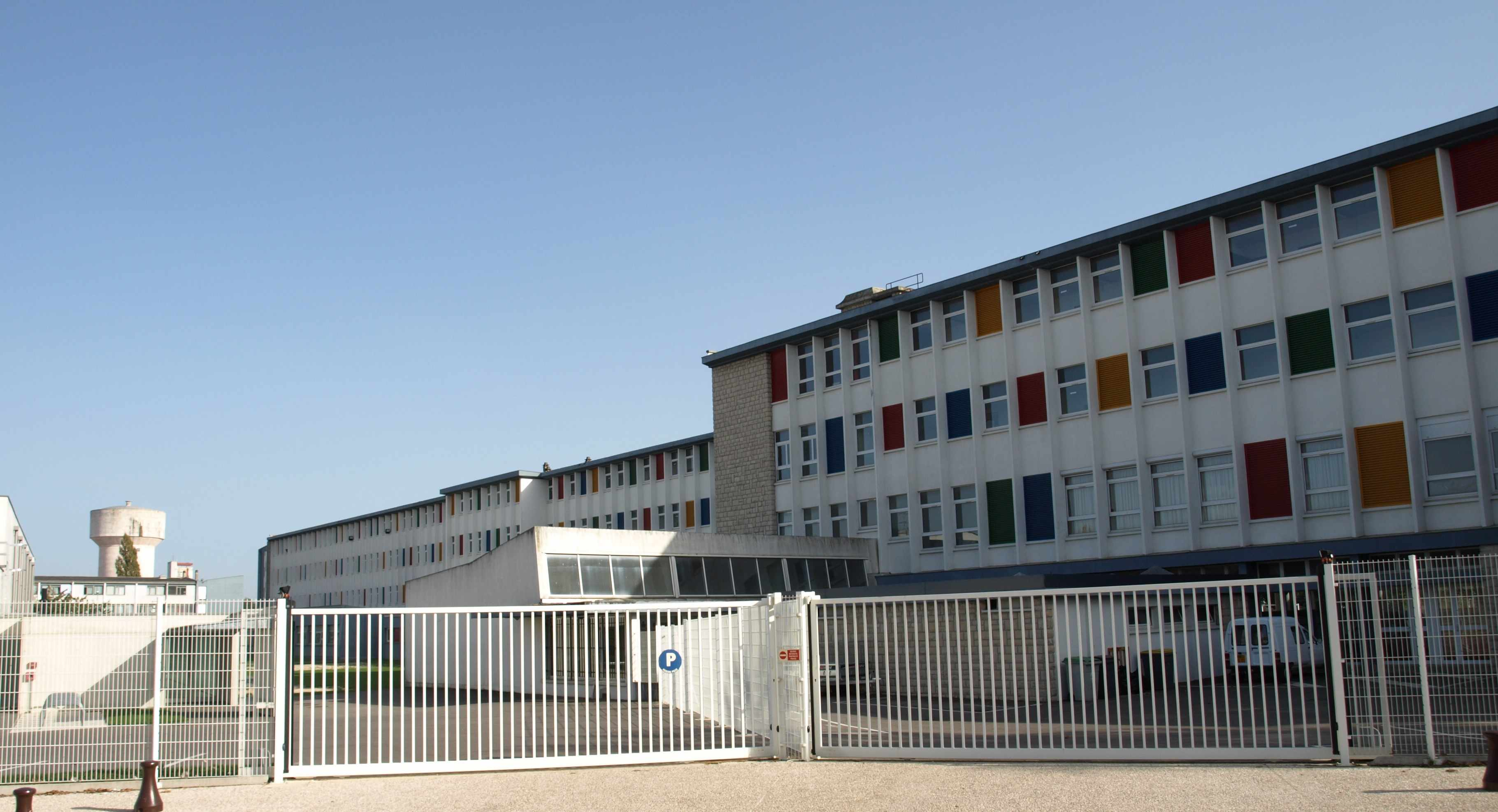
The college buildings.

The school complex includes a boarding facility, located in the Diderot building for girls and the De Moivre building for boys, with a total capacity of 200 beds. This boarding facility offers designated "excellence boarding" spots, providing rooms to middle or high school students who lack optimal study conditions in their home environments. These labeled spots come with personalized support to ensure academic success.

The school complex serves 1,200 meals daily. The kitchens are located in the Rabelais building, and a cafeteria is situated on the ground floor. Occasionally, meals are prepared and served by students from the CAP Agent Polyvalent de Restauration program.

== Results ==
=== General performance ===
In November 2010, the school complex awarded 493 diplomas. Among the 203 students who took the baccalauréat that year, 93% succeeded. The school's success rate exceeded the expected rate by 5 points compared to academic references and by 8 points relative to national benchmarks. According to the 2010 high school rankings published in Le Figaro, the institution ranked 71st out of 1,930 French general education high schools.

Baccalauréat success rate (all streams)
Year	2003	2004	2005	2006	2007	2008	2009	2010	2011	2012
Success rate	93%	93%	93%	86%	83%	83%	83%	83%	89%	92%
National rank	1287/5509	1253/5509	1275/5509	2264/5509	1981/5509	897/5509	1374/5509	1194/5509		

=== Baccalauréat performance ===
At the general baccalauréat level, half of the students earned distinctions, and 100% of candidates in the Literary stream graduated. Between 2002 and 2005, the school's baccalauréat success rate was 5% higher than the national average, despite an overrepresentation of students from working-class backgrounds—between 7 to 16 points higher than the academic average during those years. Specifically, from 2002 to 2005, the success rate in Vitry-le-François ranged between 84% and 82.7%, while it fluctuated between 77.4% and 79.5% at the academic level.

The vocational school success rates were also promising, exceeding the academic benchmark by 6 to 10 points during the same period. The vocational high school ranked 51st nationally in 2010 and led the rankings of the best vocational high schools in the Marne department in 2009, with a 100% baccalauréat success rate and an 83% transition rate to the professional baccalauréat's second year.

=== Sectional performance ===
Evolution of success rates
	BTS		Technological baccalaureate		General baccalaureate		
Year	Production	Service	STG	STI	ES	L	S
2007	78.9%	78.9%	90.0%	70,0%	90.3%	66.7%	94.7%
2008	60.0%	77.8%	94.4%	90.9%	86.5%	94.1%	95.2%
2009	55.2%	84.6%	88.4%	82.8%	92.9%	100.0%	98.4%
2010	%	%	98%	91%	88%	100.0%	94%
2011	86%	78%	84%	81%	88%	100%	95%
2012	%	%	84%	90%	91%	96%	98%

== Educational programs ==
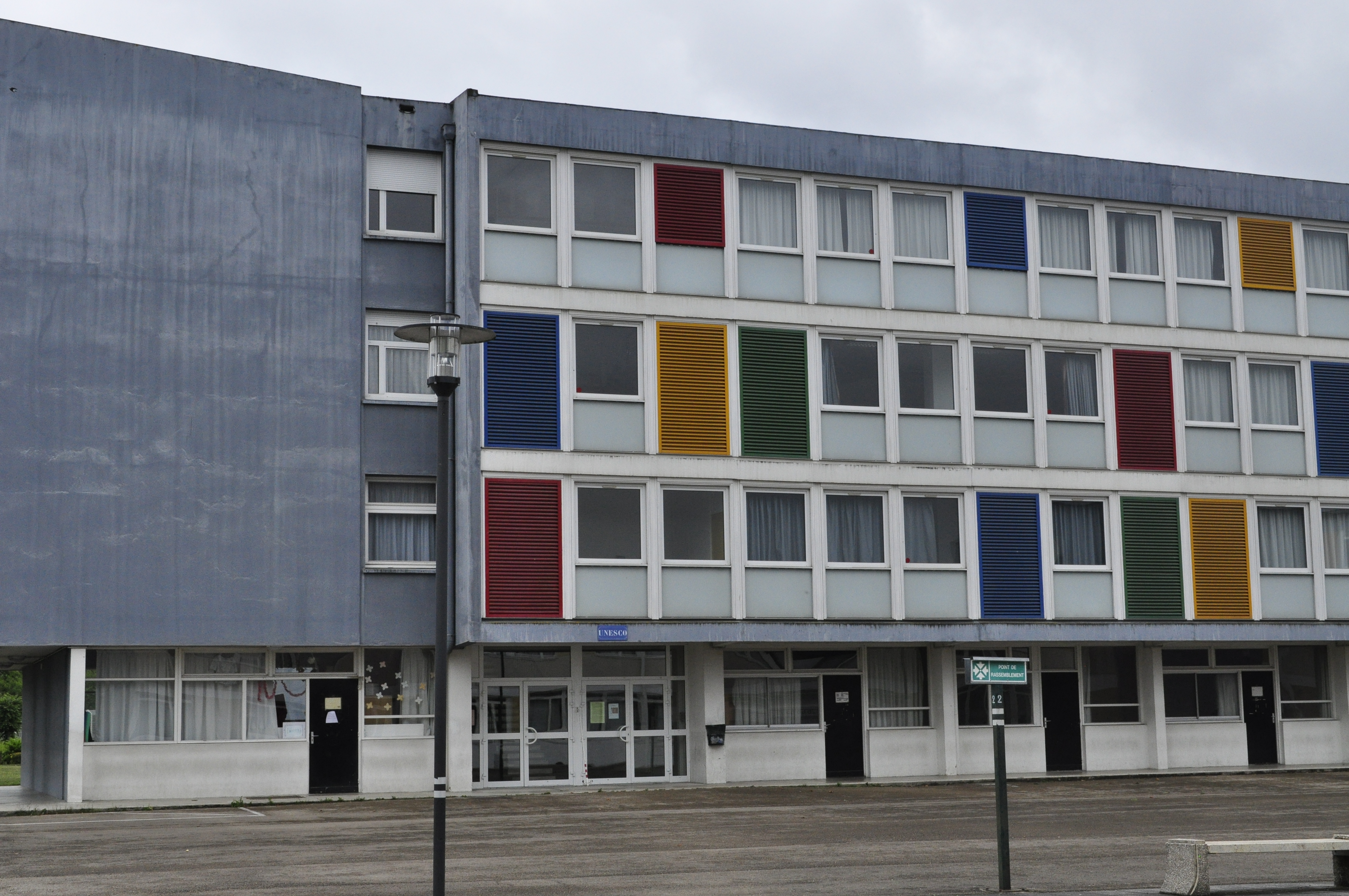
Detail of the Unesco building, whose facade, like that of most other buildings, is composed of colored panels.

The school complex has implemented Personalized Learning Workshops under the GRETA initiative. Since the 2009 school year, students pursuing general and professional baccalauréates have benefited from personalized support integrated into their schedules. This support system, known as "barrettes" (weekly slots), is based on need groups formed to address students' specific deficiencies and provide targeted remediation. Additionally, multidisciplinary professional projects (PPCP) allow for practical, long-term undertakings.

There is also an experimental class under the general mission for integration (MGI), designed to reorient students facing academic difficulties. The MGI consists of teachers and career guidance counselors who examine student records on a case-by-case basis, reintegrate students into learning processes, and use orientation tools such as school orientation assistance software (LAO) and the "LYCAM" test, aimed at combating school dropout.

The computer facilities include 700 computers, equating to one computer for every two students. All devices are connected to the regional high-speed network, making the school complex one of the best-equipped establishments in the Champagne-Ardenne region.

== Associations and clubs ==
The school hosts the "Lycée François Ier Sports Association," which, as part of the UNSS, received a municipal grant of €300,000 in 2009.

The school's Press Club publishes the student newspaper La Feuille de Chou de François. Other clubs include the "Juggling Club," which introduces students to circus professions, a Music Club, a "Math and Games Club," the "Yank–Yam" club (focused on solidarity efforts), and the "Aton Club" (dedicated to Egyptology).

Several associations are active within the school. The "Alpha Family Association" focuses on academic support for newly arrived students and offers diagnostic and remedial assistance to those struggling with the French language. The "FAB Association" (Forming a Future Without Violence) works in the field of school violence and organizes cultural events and activities.

== Culture and partnerships ==
The school complex features a cultural space and a Documentation and Information Center (CDI) located in the Marie Noël building. The CDI, established on October 15, 1997, accommodates 40 to 50 people. The librarians publish an internal magazine, Repérages, which informs teachers and students about new acquisitions.

Since 2010, the general high school has partnered with Sciences Po. Two BTS programs (BTS in Mechanical Engineering and Industrial Automation, and BTS in Computing and Networks for Industry and Technical Services) have benefited since 2009 from an agreement between the school and the French Navy. This partnership offers internships at the training center in Saint-Mandrier, near Toulon, often followed by job opportunities.

The school also collaborates with the Innovation and Technology Transfer Platform (PFT) for small and medium-sized enterprises (PME-PMI), located in Saint-Dizier. This platform was the first in France to receive certification and is one of only four in the Champagne-Ardenne region.

Additionally, the school has signed a partnership agreement with the local company Mangin-Egly, a training center for technological education. The company provides students with electricity, communication networks, and instrumentation training. The primary beneficiaries of this partnership are students in the BTS Mechanical Engineering and Industrial Automation program.

Starting in the 2024 academic year, the high school will offer an optional Arts-Theater course.

== See also ==
- Teaching
- Champagne-Ardenne
- Marne (department)
- Project-based learning

== Bibliography ==
- Commune de Vitry-le-François. "Urban Social Cohesion Contract 2007-2009" [Urban Social Cohesion Contract 2007-2009] (PDF). sig.ville.gouv.fr (in French). Archived from the original (PDF) on March 3, 2016.
- Ministry of National Education (2004). Évaluation de l'enseignement dans l'académie de Reims [Evaluation of teaching in the Reims academy] (in French). Vol. 147. Ministère de l'Éducation nationale.
- Commune de Vitry-le-François (2004). "L'enseignement" [Teaching]. Vitry-le-François (in French). Reims. ISBN 2-9508561-0-1.
- Peuchot, André (1960). Vitry-le-François : quelques pages de son histoire [Vitry-le-François: a few pages from its history] (in French).
