= Éric Rohmer: A Biography =

2014 book by Antoine de Baecque and Noël Herpe

- Author: Antoine de Baecque; Noël Herpe
- Original title: Éric Rohmer : biographie
- Translator: Steven Rendall; Lisa Neal
- Language: French
- Subject: Éric Rohmer
- Genre: biography
- Publisher: Stock
- Publication date: 3 January 2014
- Publication place: France
- English publication date: June 2016
- Pages: 608
- ISBN: 9782234075610

Éric Rohmer: A Biography (French: Éric Rohmer : biographie) is a biography about the French filmmaker and critic Éric Rohmer, written by Antoine de Baecque and Noël Herpe. It was published in French by Stock in 2014 and in English by Columbia University Press in 2016. It covers Rohmer's work as a filmmaker, his association with the French New Wave, his work for the film magazine Cahiers du Cinéma and how he constructed his films as "traps" for the characters.
