= Center for Documentation and Information =

School libraries in France

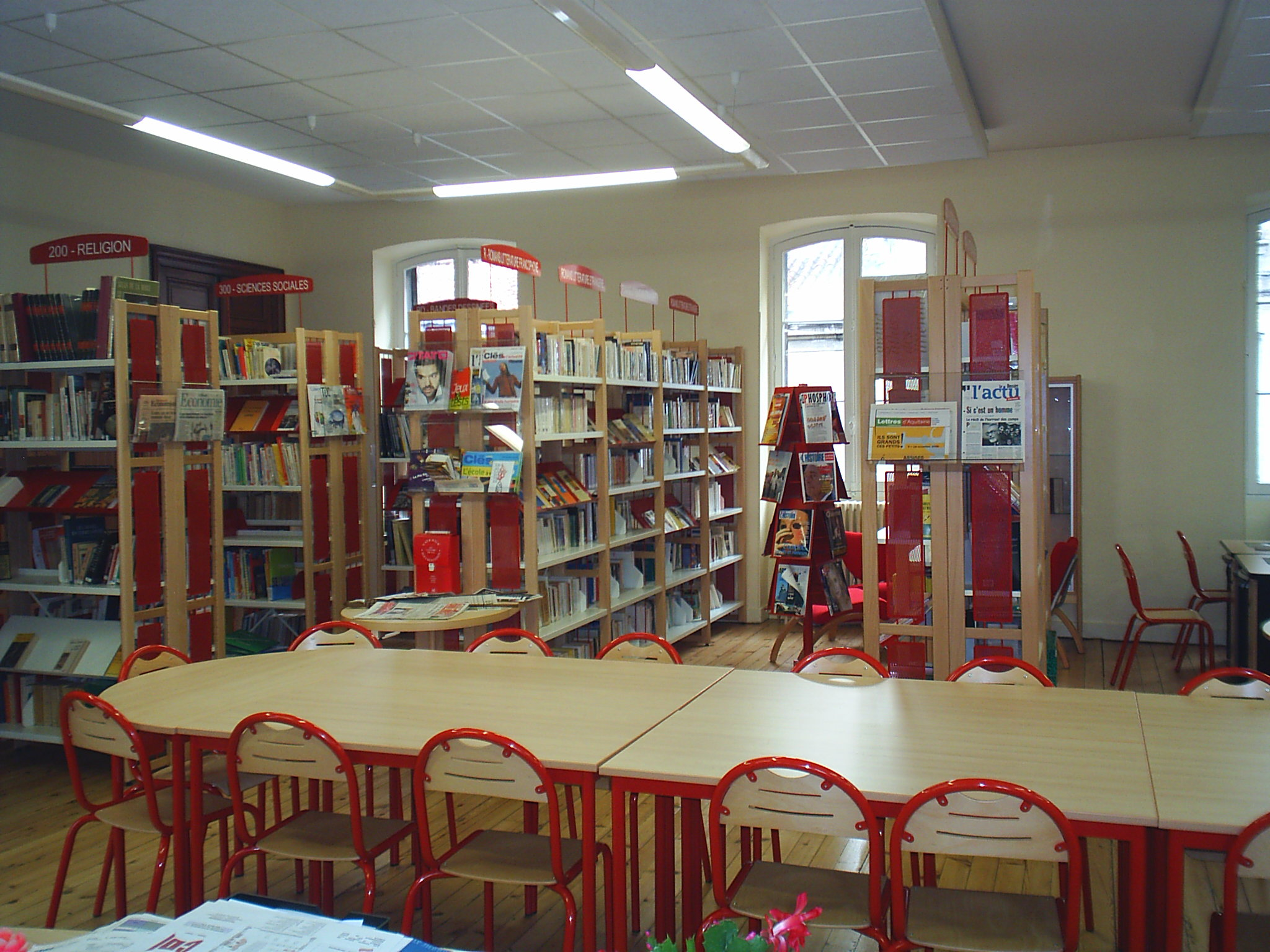
The Center for Documentation and Information at the lycée Le Mirail.

Since 1973, all French collèges and lycées have established centers for documentation and information (CDI). These centers are managed by teacher-librarians, who are chosen through a competitive examination known as the CAPES in Documentation. This examination was introduced by the Minister of National Education, Lionel Jospin, in 1989.

== History ==
=== Before the Second World War ===
The early development of school libraries primarily involved specialized collections intended for educators. In contrast, students occasionally had access to classroom libraries, which offered classic literature.

In 1862, a ministerial order and a circular letter mandated the establishment of a library in each public elementary school, outlining the operational guidelines for these libraries. Despite this initiative, many libraries faced challenges such as insufficient resources, inadequate facilities, and a shortage of qualified personnel, leading to a decline in their operation in the early 20th century.

=== 1945-1958 ===
The broader context during this period was one of post-war reconstruction, marked by an "information explosion" and a diversification of documentary media. Despite the comprehensive educational reform efforts of 1946-47, the Langevin-Wallon plan was not fully realized. However, its lasting influence on education, particularly its focus on developing individuals as "the man, the worker, the citizen", continues to inspire educational practices.

The idea of "new education" contributed to the establishment of "central libraries" in secondary schools. This initiative aimed to achieve two main goals: to consolidate various facilities and to promote student-led activities and clubs, representing a progressive change in educational methodologies.

In 1952, a circular outlining the role of documentation in secondary education marked a significant development in the integration of documentation as a pedagogical tool for student work. This initiative was bolstered by the establishment of the CNDP (Centre National de Documentation Pédagogique), now referred to as the Réseau Canopé. The CNDP was designed as a collaborative space for teachers, featuring a documentation resource center and audiovisual materials.

Four decades later, this concept gained renewed relevance with the onset of the digital age. The importance of the CDI was emphasized, highlighting that its role extends beyond merely providing students with access to a wide range of documentation; it also involves educating them on how to effectively utilize this documentation to extract valuable information.

=== 1958 - 1975 ===
In 1958, Marcel Sire, the principal of Lycée Janson-de-Sailly, initiated the establishment of the first Local Educational Documentation Center (LEDC). By 1962, these centers were rebranded as Documentation Services (DS) following the circular titled "General instruction concerning the documentation service of educational establishments." In 1966, the designation changed again to Documentation and Information Services (DIS) under the leadership of Marcel Sire, who had become the General Inspector of School Life. This transition was driven by the implementation of circular n°66-43, entitled "Organization of documentation services and school libraries for the start of the 1966 school year," which aimed to enhance the centers' focus on providing services to both teachers and students.

Subsequently, these services were redefined as Centers for Documentation and Information (CDIs) following the circular issued on March 27, 1973. This circular signified an intention to establish CDIs as the "heart" of educational institutions. Marcel Sire is often cited for his statement that "the school is a documentation center with something around it, just as a living being of superior rank is something around a heart." This transformation marked a shift in the role of CDIs from simply providing services to embracing a more comprehensive educational function.

During this period, the staff from the previously separate "general libraries" (intended for educators) and "central" libraries (designed for students) were consolidated under a unified designation. The former "documentalists" and "librarians" were reclassified as "documentalist-librarians." Additionally, the previously distinct associations merged to form the FNEDCA (Federation of National Education Documentalist-Librarian Associations), reflecting this integration and the evolving role of library personnel within the educational system.

In 1974, the "Tallon Report," authored by the Inspector General for School Establishments and Life, provided a precise definition of the role and operation of Centers for Documentation and Information (CDIs). The report emphasized that the documentary center serves as a crucial, if not essential, resource for promoting responsibility, initiative, and a revitalized approach to pedagogy and school life.

Additionally, the report outlined seven key functions that the CDI must fulfill, which the documentalist is required to perform in collaboration with the school's administrative and educational staff. This framework aimed to enhance the effectiveness of CDIs in supporting the educational environment. These functions include:

- Technical services
- Reception services
- General information
- Public relations
- Leisure activities
- School and professional information
- Academic services

=== 1975-1989 ===
The initial circular published in 1977 outlined the roles and responsibilities of individuals responsible for managing CDIs in secondary educational institutions. This circular marked a significant shift from earlier definitions, as it characterized the function of documentalists as "essentially pedagogical." This change underscored the evolving perception of the role of documentalists, emphasizing their integral contribution to the educational process and the learning environment within schools.

After the 1977 circular, the 1986 publication of the circular "Responsibilities of Staff Working in Documentation and Information Centers" became a foundational text informing the profession for the subsequent three decades. The document reaffirmed the essentially pedagogical role of the documentalist teacher, outlining four primary missions that would endure: to initiate and train students in documentary research, to work closely with the school's pedagogical activities, to participate in the school's opening up, and to be responsible for managing the documentalist resource center.

Following the 1977 circular, the 1986 publication titled "Responsibilities of Staff Working in Documentation and Information Centers" emerged as a foundational text that would guide the profession for the next thirty years. This document reaffirmed the fundamentally pedagogical role of the documentalist teacher and outlined four primary missions that have continued to be relevant:

1. Initiating and Training Students in Documentary Research: Educating students on how to effectively conduct research using available documentation.
2. Collaborating with the School's Pedagogical Activities: Working closely with teachers and educational staff to integrate documentation into the curriculum.
3. Participating in the School's Opening Up: Engaging with the broader community and facilitating access to information resources.
4. Managing the Documentalist Resource Center: Overseeing the operations and resources of the CDI to ensure it meets the educational needs of students and staff.

Ultimately, the 1989 law on education formalized the establishment of the CAPES in documentary science and techniques, recognizing the importance of specialized training for professionals in this field.

In 2017, a new circular titled "The Responsibilities of Documentalist Teachers" was introduced, which updated and repealed the 1986 circular. This new document aimed to reflect the evolving landscape of education and the role of documentalist teachers, ensuring that their responsibilities and functions were aligned with contemporary educational practices and needs.

=== The future of the CDIs ===
The rise of the Internet and the development of digital resources have strengthened the role of CDIs in training students in "information culture and critical and responsible use of information tools and sources." Since 2012, CDIs have been exploring and reflecting on their evolution into "centers of knowledge and culture" (3Cs), inspired by English e-learning centers. These centers are envisioned as central resource areas within educational institutions, with a focus on integrating them into the local community. The aim is to harmonize traditional books with digital resources, promoting the decompartmentalization of school spaces and schedules. This initiative seeks to create environments that facilitate personalized support for students and encourage the development of innovative teaching practices, ultimately providing students with a conducive space for both work and collaboration.

== Activities ==
The information and documentary training provided in CDIs plays a crucial role in developing students' information culture. This encompasses a broad range of knowledge, including:

- Understanding information and digital environments: Navigating the complexities of online and offline information sources.
- Information retrieval and utilization: Developing effective search strategies and using information to create documents.
- Media literacy: Understanding news media, social media, and the history of communication.
- Information law: Developing awareness of legal aspects related to information access and use.

Documentalist teachers may work independently or collaborate with other professionals in junior high schools, depending on the specific educational project. In secondary education, they often participate in programs like TPE (Personal Training Project), ECJS (Civic, Economic, and Social Education), or exploratory courses to impart the documentary culture necessary for students to navigate the global information landscape. However, the number of documentalist teachers recruited does not align with the number of students. Typically, one teacher is employed at the college level and two at the lycée. According to a union representing these educators, this ratio hinders the implementation of comprehensive documentary learning for all students.

== Management and development ==
Since 2004, the General Inspectorate for Documentation has facilitated the development of documentary policy, which aims to define the objectives of documentary services in order to effectively serve a specific audience. However, many documentalist teachers express reluctance to categorize their activities under a "documentalist policy." This hesitance is often rooted in concerns regarding potential oversight and control by the Board of Directors. As a result, some documentalist teachers pursue documentary projects that operate independently of info-documentary learning. Since 2012, the Inspectorate General has also focused on transforming CDIs into "3Cs"—centers of knowledge and culture—inspired by the Anglo-Saxon and university concept of Learning Centers. This initiative has sparked discussions about the autonomy of students, especially in middle schools, as there are concerns that the project may undervalue the importance of info-documentary learning. Additionally, the 3C project has faced limited acceptance among professionals in the field, reflecting ongoing debate regarding the balance between educational objectives and the autonomy granted to students.

At the international level, the School Libraries section of IFLA (the International Federation of Library Associations and Institutions) provides recommendations and guidelines that outline the essential components of a school library. These guidelines serve as a framework for the development and organization of CDIs, promoting effective learning environments within educational institutions. These components include:

- Study and Research Area: This space should be equipped with an information desk, catalogs, work tables, and other necessary resources to support student research and study.
- Reading Area: A designated area for reading materials, which includes novels and periodicals, allowing students to engage with various texts.
- Learning Area: A flexible space that can accommodate small groups or entire classes, equipped with digital tools to facilitate collaborative learning and instruction.
- Document Production and Group Work Space: A dedicated area for students to produce documents and work collaboratively on projects.
- Management Area: This area should include management offices and storage for archives and equipment, ensuring efficient operation and organization of the CDI.

== Bibliography ==
- Bayard-Pierlot, Jacqueline; Birglin, Marie-José (1991). Le CDI au cœur du projet pédagogique (in French). Hachette. ISBN 978-2010178078.
- Chapron, Françoise (2001). Les CDI des lycées et collèges (in French). Presses universitaires de France. ISBN 9782130520368.
- Britan-Fournier, Odile (1997). "La culture documentaire en milieu scolaire : naissance et évolution". Spirale - Revue de recherches en éducation (in French). 19: 7–31. doi:10.3406/spira.1997.1605.
- Mialaret, Gaston (1991). Pédagogie générale (in French). Presses Universitaires de France. ISBN 978-2130438335.
- Weis, Hélène (2005). Les bibliothèques pour enfants entre 1945 et 1975 (in French). Éditions du Cercle de la Librairie. doi:10.3917/elec.weis.2005.01. ISBN 978-2-7654-0898-7.
- Henard, Charlotte; ABF (2019). Le métier de bibliothécaire (in French). Editions du Cercle de La Librairie. ISBN 978-2765415787.
- Carbone, Pierre (2017). Les bibliothèques (in French). Paris: Presses universitaires de France. pp. 59–67. ISBN 978-2-13-078754-9.
- Chapron, Françoise; Delamotte, Éric; Béguin-Verbrugge, Annette (2010). L'éducation à la culture informationnelle : colloque, [Lille, octobre 2008] (in French). ENSSIB. ISBN 978-2910227753.
- IFLA School Libraries Section Standing Committee (2015). Schultz-Jones, Barbara; Oberg, Dianne (eds.). IFLA School Library Guidelines (PDF). International Federation of Library Associations and Institutions.

== See also ==
=== Related articles ===
- Information and media literacy
- Teacher-librarian

=== External links ===
- Professeur-e-s documentalistes : une identité professionnelle toujours problématique? (in French)
