= Prix du Syndicat de la critique =

Critics' Union Prize
- Prix du Syndicat de la critique (French)
- Country: France
- First award: 1963; 63 years ago
- Website: associationcritiquetmd.com

The prix du Syndicat de la critique is a French prize is awarded by the Professional Critic Union Association Professionnelle de la Critique de théâtre, de musique et de danse a theatre, music, dance workers union, the new name, since January 2015, of the "Syndicat professionnel de la critique de théâtre, de musique et de danse".

Since 1963, the prix du Syndicat de la critique, awarded in June each year, recognize the shows and artistic personalities who have marked the season.

== Categories ==
=== Theatre ===
- Grand prix (Best theater show of the year)
- Prix Georges-Lerminier (Best theatrical show created in the province)
- Meilleure création d'une pièce en langue française (Best creation of a piece in French)
- Meilleur spectacle étranger (Best Foreign Show)
- Prix Laurent-Terzieff (best show presented in a private theater)
- Meilleure comédienne (Best actress)
- Meilleur comédien (Best actor)
- Meilleur créateur d'élément scénique ( Best scenic element creator, set designer, costume designer, lighting designer)
- Meilleur compositeur de musique de scène
- Prix Jean-Jacques-Lerrant (révélation théâtrale de l'année)
- Meilleur livre sur le théâtre (Best book on theatre)

=== Musique ===
- Grand prix
- Prix Claude-Rostand (meilleur spectacle lyrique en province)
- Meilleure création musicale (Best musical creation)
- Personnalité musicale de l'année (Musical Personality of the Year)
- Révélation musicale de l'année
- Meilleur livre sur la musique (Best music book)
- Meilleure diffusion musicale audiovisuelle (Best audiovisual music broadcast)

=== Dance ===
- Grand prix
- Prix de l'Europe francophone (French-speaking Europe Prize)
- Meilleur spectacle étranger (Best Foreign Show) (2001–2008)
- Révélation chorégraphique de l'année (Choreographic revelation of the year)
- Personnalité chorégraphique de l'année Choreographic personality of the year (since 2009)
- Meilleur livre sur la danse (Best book on dance)
- Prix spécial du jury (Special jury prize)
