= Information and media literacy =

Information and media literacy (IML) is a combination of information literacy and media literacy. It enables people to show and make informed judgments as users of information and media, as well as to become skillful creators and producers of information and media messages. The transformative nature of IML includes creative works and creating new knowledge; to publish and collaborate responsibly requires ethical, cultural and social understanding.

IML is also known as media and information literacy (MIL). UNESCO first adopted the term MIL in 2008 as a "composite concept" combining the competencies of information literacy and media literacy.

Prior to the 1990s, the primary focus of information literacy was research skills. Media literacy, a study that emerged around the 1970s, traditionally focuses on the analysis and the delivery of information through various forms of media. These days, the study of information literacy has been extended to include the study of media literacy in many countries like the UK, Australia and New Zealand. It is also referred to as information and communication technologies (ICT) in the United States. Educators such as Gregory Ulmer have also defined the field as electracy.

== Integration of media and information literacy ==
Historically, the fields of information and media literacy have been separate, but over the course of the 21st century there have been calls to integrate both fields. Media education has primarily taken place in educational institutions, while information education has primarily occurred in libraries. Discussions surrounding the overlap of information literacy and media literacy came to fruition in the mid-to-late 2000s and 2010s as noted by Marcus Leaning.

== In the digital age ==
The definition of literacy is "the ability to read and write". In practice many more skills are needed to locate, critically assess and make effective use of information. By extension, literacy now also includes the ability to manage and interact with digital information and media, in personal, shared and public domains.

Historically, "information literacy" has largely been seen from the relatively top-down, organisational viewpoint of library and information sciences. However the same term is also used to describe a generic "information literacy" skill.

The modern digital age has led to the proliferation of information spread across the Internet. Individuals must be able to recognize whether information is true or false and better yet know how to locate, evaluate, use, and communicate information in various formats; this is called information literacy.

Towards the end of the 20th century, literacy was redefined to include "new literacies" relating to the new skills needed in everyday experience. "Multiliteracies" recognised the multiplicity of literacies, which were often used in combination. "21st century skills" frameworks link new literacies to wider life skills such as creativity, critical thinking, accountability.

What these approaches have in common is a focus on the multiple skills needed by individuals to navigate changing personal, professional and public "information landscapes".

As the conventional definition of literacy itself continues to evolve among practitioners, so too has the definition of information literacies. Noteworthy definitions include:

- CILIP, the Chartered Institute of Library and Information Practitioners, defines information literacy as "the ability to think critically and make balanced judgements about any information we find and use".
- JISC, the Joint Information Systems Committee, refers to information literacy as one of six "digital capabilities", seen as an interconnected group of elements centered on "ICT literacy".
- Mozilla groups digital and other literacies as "21st century skills", a "broad set of knowledge, skills, habits and traits that are important to succeed in today's world".
- UNESCO, the United Nations Educational, Scientific and Cultural Organization asserts information literacy as a "universal human right".

== 21st-century students ==
The IML learning capacities prepare students to be 21st century literate. According to Jeff Wilhelm (2000), "technology has everything to do with literacy. And being able to use the latest electronic technologies has everything to do with being literate." He supports his argument with J. David Bolter's statement that "if our students are not reading and composing with various electronic technologies, then they are illiterate. They are not just unprepared for the future; they are illiterate right now, in our current time and context".

Wilhelm's statement is supported by the 2005 Wired World Phase II (YCWW II) survey conducted by the Media Awareness Network of Canada on 5000 Grade 4–11 students. The key findings of the survey were:

- 62% of Grade 4 students prefer the Internet.
- 38% of Grade 4 students prefer the library.
- 91% of Grade 11 students prefer the Internet.
- 9% of Grade 11 students prefer the library.

Marc Prensky (2001) uses the term "digital native" to describe people who have been brought up in a digital world. The Internet has been a pervasive element of young people's home lives. 94% of kids reported that they had Internet access at home, and a significant majority (61%) had a high-speed connection.

By the time kids reach Grade 11, half of them (51 percent) have their own Internet-connected computer, separate and apart from the family computer. The survey also showed that young Canadians are now among the most wired in the world. Contrary to the earlier stereotype of the isolated and awkward computer nerd, today's wired kid is a social kid.

In general, many students are better networked through the use of technology than most teachers and parents, who may not understand the abilities of technology. Students are no longer limited to desktop computer. They may use mobile technologies to graph mathematical problems, research a question for social studies, text message an expert for information, or send homework to a drop box. Students are accessing information by using MSN, personal Web pages, Weblogs and social networking sites.

== Teaching and learning in the 21st century ==
Learning any language is best done early in a child's development. In acquiring a second language, Hyltenstam (1992) found that around the age of 6 and 7 seemed to be a cut-off point for bilinguals to achieve native-like proficiency. After that age, second language learners could get near-native-like-ness but their language would, while consisting of very few actual errors, have enough errors that would set them apart from the first language group. Although more recent research suggests this impact still exists up to 10 years of age.

Kindergarten and grades 1 and 2 are therefore critical to student success as digital natives because not all students have a "digital"-rich childhood. Students learning technological skills before Grade 3 can become equivalently bilingual. Research was found that "Language-minority students who cannot read and write proficiently in English cannot participate fully in American schools, workplaces, or society. They face limited job opportunities and earning power."

== In the curriculum ==
Information and Media Literacy has been embraced in the curriculum in order to develop the strategies needed for informed, critical, and engaged individuals and citizens. Organizations such as the European Commission and UNESCO have been promoting initiatives and providing instructional documentation about the curricular integration of IML.

=== Europe ===
==== United Kingdom ====
In the UK, education of Information and Media Literacy is typically introduced through mainstream formal education in secondary, further and higher education curriculum (such as Media Studies classes), broader curriculum or extra-curricular activity (such as literacy education or Citizenship), e-safety policies, or computer and information literacy/education outside of the formal educational system.

IML has been promoted among educators through an information literacy website developed by several organizations that have been involved in the field. Ofcom, or the Office of Communications, is another organization that researches and promotes IML in the UK.

=== North America ===
==== United States ====
IML is included in the Partnership for the 21st Century program sponsored by the US Department of Education. Special mandates have been provided to Arizona, Iowa, Kansas, Maine, New Jersey, Massachusetts, North Carolina, South Dakota, West Virginia and Wisconsin. Individual school districts, such as the Clarkstown Central School District, have also developed their own information literacy curriculum. ISTE has also produced the National Educational Technology Standards for Students, Teachers and Administrators.

==== Canada ====
In British Columbia, Canada, the Ministry of Education has de-listed the Information Technology K to 7 IRP as a stand-alone course. It is still expected that all the prescribed learning outcomes continue to be integrated. Unfortunately, there has been no clear direction to implement IML.

The BC Ministry of Education published the Information and Communications Technology Integration Performance Standards, Grades 5 to 10 ICTI in 2005. These standards provide performance standards expectations for Grade 5 to 10; however, they do not provide guidance for other grades, and the expectation for a Grade 5 and Grade 10 student are the same.

=== Latin America ===
==== Mexico ====
UNESCO founded the Network for Media and Information Literacy in Mexico in August 2021. This project aimed to introduce a pathway for academia, government/civil organizations, and other institutions to promote the spread of media and information literacy skills. The MIL Network Mexico focused on making visible the issues surrounding MIL in Mexico, such as disinformation and hate speech. This focus on visibility also promotes to aid in developing appropriate MIL skills across disenfranchised groups, teens and young adults, and key figures that amplify the spread of information like journalists and educators.

There are multiple members of the MIL Network Mexico that actively promote its mission: UNESCO MILID CHAIR UDG, DW Akademie, Instituto Mexicano de la Radio (IMER), Instituto Nacional Electoral (INE), SocialTIC, Universidad Autonóma de Nuevo León, Universidad Veracruzana, and UNESCO México.

=== Middle East and North Africa ===
In the Arab region, media and information literacy was largely ignored up until 2011, when the Media Studies Program at the American University of Beirut, the Open Society Foundations and the Arab-US Association for Communication Educators (AUSACE) launched a regional conference themed "New Directions: Digital and Media Literacy". The conference attracted significant attention from Arab universities and scholars, who discussed obstacles and needs to advance media literacy in the Arab region, including developing curricula in Arabic, training faculty and promoting the field.

Following up on that recommendation, the Media Studies Program at AUB and the Open Society Foundations in collaboration with the Salzburg Academy on Media and Global Change launched in 2013 the first regional initiative to develop, vitalize, and advance media literacy education in the Arab region. The Media and Digital Literacy Academy of Beirut (MDLAB) offered an annual two-week summer training program in addition to working year-round to develop media literacy curricula and programs. The academy is conducted in Arabic and English and brings pioneering international instructors and professionals to teach advanced digital and media literacy concepts to young Arab academics and graduate students from various fields. MDLAB hopes that the participating Arab academics will carry what they learned to their countries and institutions and offers free curricular material in Arabic and English, including media literacy syllabi, lectures, exercises, lesson plans, and multi-media material, to assist and encourage the integration of digital and media literacy into Arab university and school curricula.

In recognition of MDLAB's accomplishments in advancing media literacy education in the Arab region, the founder of MDLAB received the 2015 UNESCO-UNAOC International Media and Information Literacy Award.

Prior to 2013, only two Arab universities offered media literacy courses: the American University of Beirut (AUB) and the American University of Sharjah (AUS). Three years after the launch of MDLAB, over two dozen Arab universities incorporated media literacy education into their curricula, both as stand-alone courses or as modules injected into their existing media courses. Among the universities who have full-fledged media literacy courses (as of 2015) are Lebanese American University (Lebanon), Birzeit University (Palestine), University of Balamand (Lebanon), Damascus University (Syria), Rafik Hariri University (Lebanon), Notre Dame University (Lebanon), Ahram Canadian University (Egypt), American University of Beirut (Lebanon), American University of Sharjah (UAE), and Al Azm University (Lebanon). The first Arab school to adopt media literacy as part of its strategic plan is the International College (IC) in Lebanon. Efforts to introduce media literacy to the region's other universities and schools continues with the help of other international organizations, such as UNESCO, UNAOC, AREACORE, DAAD, and OSF.

=== East Asia and Pacific ===
In Singapore and Hong Kong, information literacy or information technology was listed as a formal curriculum.

==== Japan ====
The Ministry of Education, Culture, Sports, Science and Technology (MEXT), and the Ministry of Internal Affairs and Communication (MIC) are two governmental ministries in Japan that are actively promoting Media and Information Literacy education. MEXT has set national curriculum guidelines surrounding use of information and communication technologies by students. MIC produces media literacy materials for formal and informal settings, as well as organized a study group to research "internet governance" for platforms and their services.

==== Thailand ====
In 2003, as UNESCO promoted Media and Information Literacy education, media literacy was incorporated into the core curriculum of primary and secondary schools and in some higher education institutions in Thailand.

The Deputy Prime Minister and Minister of Digital Economy and Society, Prasert Chantarawongthong, announced nine key initiatives for 2025 focused on enhancing digital literacy, bridging the digital divide, improving safety in digital interactions, and building public confidence in the digital ecosystem.

== Barriers ==
One barrier to learning to read is the lack of books, while a barrier to learning IML is the lack of technology access.

== Key information literacies ==
Information literacies are the multiple literacies individuals may need to function effectively in the global information society. The following are key information literacies.

=== Critical literacy ===
Critical literacy is the application of critical social theory to literacy. Critical literacy finds embedded discrimination in media by analyzing the messages promoting prejudiced power relationships found naturally in media and written material that go unnoticed otherwise by reading beyond the author's words and examining the manner in which the author has conveyed their ideas about society's norms to determine whether these ideas contain racial or gender inequality.

=== Computer literacy ===
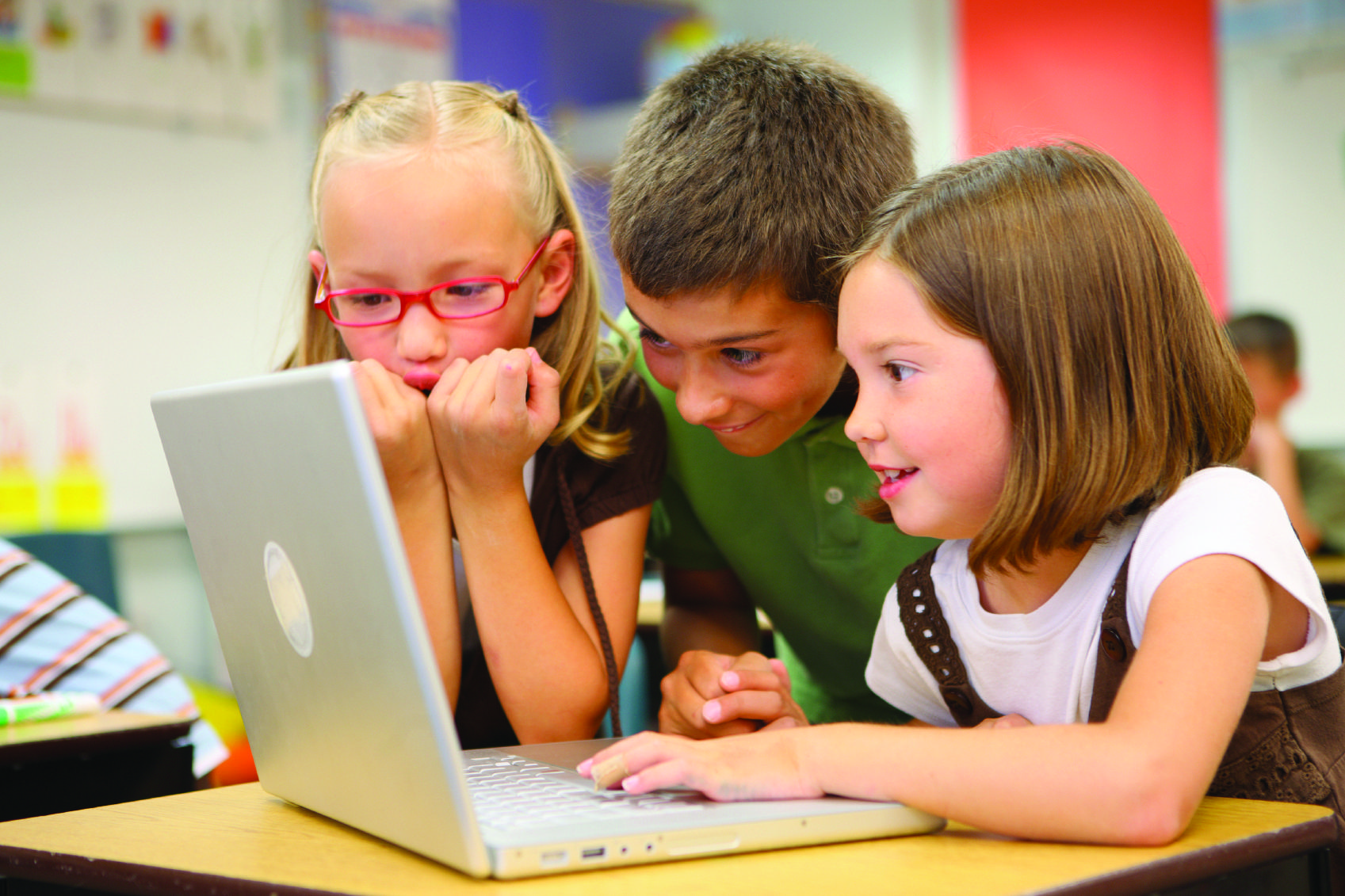
Children using a laptop computer at school (2008)

"Computer literacy" is defined as the knowledge and ability to use computers and related technology efficiently, with skill levels ranging from elementary use to computer programming and advanced problem solving. Computer literacy can also refer to the comfort level someone has with using computer programs and applications. Another valuable component is understanding how computers work and operate. Computer literacy may be distinguished from computer programming, which primarily focuses on the design and coding of computer programs rather than the familiarity and skill in their use. Various countries, including the United Kingdom and the United States, have created initiatives to improve national computer literacy rates.

=== Data literacy ===
Data literacy is the ability to read, understand, create, and communicate data as information. Much like literacy as a general concept, data literacy focuses on the competencies involved in working with data. It is, however, not similar to the ability to read text since it requires certain skills involving reading and understanding data.

Data literacy refers to the ability to understand, interpret, critically evaluate, and effectively communicate data in context to inform decisions and drive action. It is not a technical skill but a fundamental capability for everyone, encompassing the skills and mindset necessary to transform raw data into meaningful insights and apply these insights within real-world scenarios.

In recent years, data literacy has become recognized as an important skill beyond just data scientists or researchers. As data shapes more aspects of daily life, including social media, online shopping, and personal decision making, the ability to interpret and use data helps people make informed choices and participate effectively in a data driven world.

=== Digital literacy ===
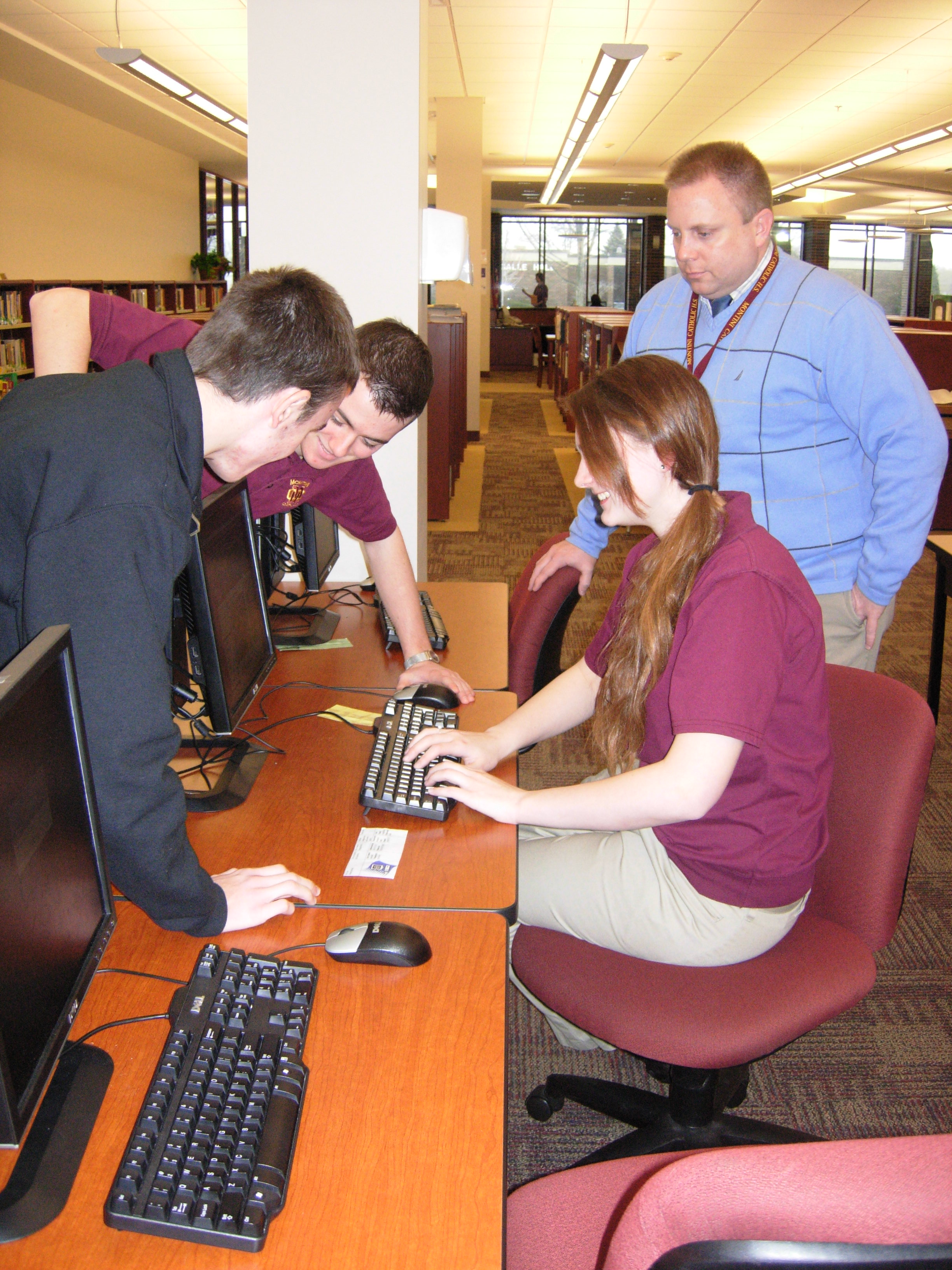
A teacher and his students in a computer lab

Digital literacy is an individual's ability to find, evaluate, and communicate information using digital devices or digital media platforms, as well as the ability to navigate, evaluate, create, and communicate information in digital environments. Digital literacy combines technical and cognitive abilities; it includes using information and communication technologies to create, evaluate, and share information, and critically examining their social and political impacts.

Digital literacy initially focused on digital skills and stand-alone computers, but the advent of the internet and social media use has shifted some of its focus to mobile devices.

Digital literacy is related to, but different from, other forms of literacy. Information literacy focuses on the ability to locate, evaluate, and utilize information through numerous formats. Media literacy refers to the ability to analyze and interpret media messages and their influence. In contrast, digital literacy integrates these competencies while also including the practical use of digital tools, participation in online environments, and the creation of digital content. This broader scope highlights the interactive and participatory nature of digital spaces. While media literacy and information literacy can play a role in one's digital literacy, digital literacy refers to the digital platforms and the way information and messages are interpreted and conveyed.

=== Financial literacy ===
Financial literacy is the possession of skills, knowledge, behavior, and attitude that allow an individual to make informed decisions regarding money. Financial literacy, financial education, and financial knowledge are used interchangeably. Financially unsophisticated individuals cannot plan for their future because of their poor financial knowledge. Financially sophisticated individuals are good at financial calculations; for example they understand compound interest, which helps them to engage in low-credit borrowing. Most of the time, unsophisticated individuals pay high costs for their debt borrowing.

=== Health literacy ===
Health literacy is the ability to obtain, read, understand, and use healthcare information in order to make appropriate health decisions and follow instructions for treatment. There are multiple definitions of health literacy, in part because health literacy involves both the context (or setting) in which health literacy demands are made (e.g., health care, media, internet or fitness facility) and the skills that people bring to that situation.

=== Media literacy ===
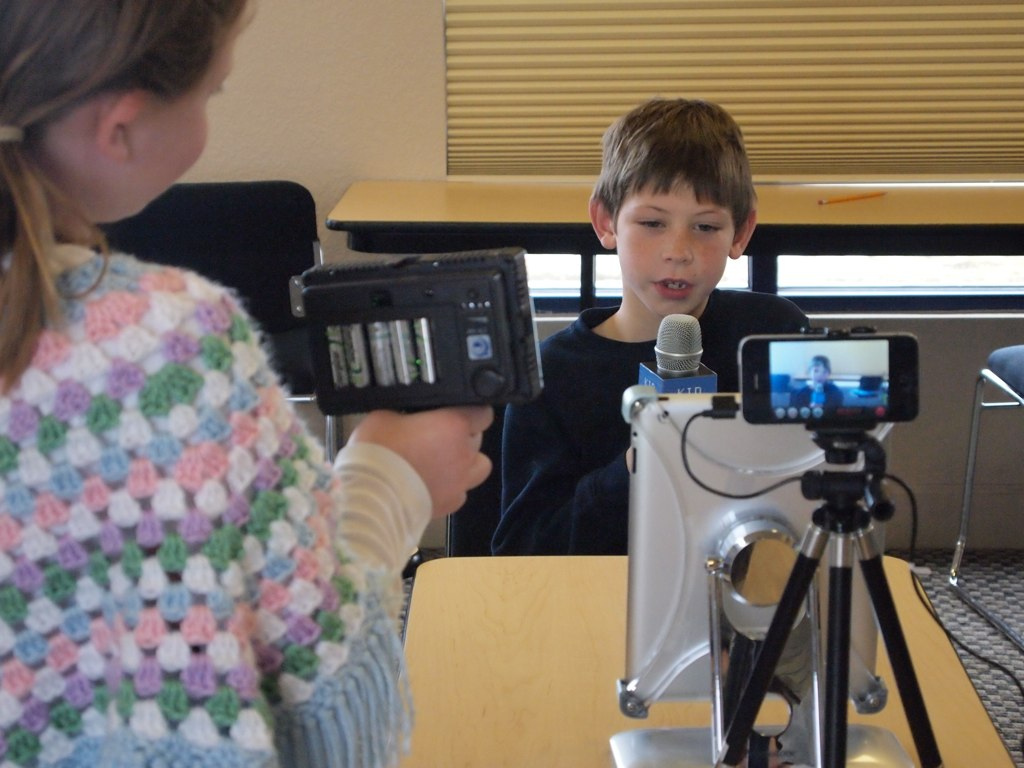
Schoolchildren working on a multimedia project (2012)

Examples of media literacy include reflecting on one's media choices, identifying sponsored content, recognizing stereotypes, analyzing propaganda and discussing the benefits, risks, and harms of media use. Critical analysis skills can be developed through practices like constructivist media decoding and lateral reading, which entails looking at multiple perspectives when evaluating media content. Media literacy also includes the ability to create and share messages as a socially responsible communicator. The practices of safety and civility, information access, and civic voice and engagement are sometimes referred to as digital citizenship.

=== Transliteracy ===
Transliteracy is "a fluidity of movement across a range of technologies, media and contexts". It is an ability to use diverse techniques to collaborate across different social groups.

Transliteracy combines a range of capabilities required to move across a range of contexts, media, technologies and genres. Conceptually, transliteracy is situated across five capabilities: information capabilities (see information literacy), ICT (information and communication technologies), communication and collaboration, creativity and critical thinking. It is underpinned by literacy and numeracy. (See figure below) The concept of transliteracy is impacting the system of education and libraries.

=== Visual literacy ===
Visual literacy is the ability to interpret, negotiate, and make meaning from information presented in the form of an image, extending the meaning of literacy, which commonly signifies interpretation of a written or printed text. Visual literacy is based on the idea that pictures can be "read" and that meaning can be discovered through a process of reading.

=== Web literacy ===
Web literacy encompasses the skills and competencies needed for reading, writing, and participating on the World Wide Web. It has been described as "both content and activity" meaning that web users should not just learn about the web but also about how to make their own website.

== See also ==
- Critical literacy
- Digital literacy
- Multiliteracy
- Numeracy
- Visual literacy
- Center for Documentation and Information

=== Sources ===
- August, Diane. (2006). Developing Literacy in Second-Language Learners: Report of the National Literacy Panel on Language-Minority Children and Youth. 1. Retrieved March 24, 2007 from
- BC Ministry of Education. (2006). Information and Communication Technology Integration. Retrieved December 1, 2006, from B.C. Performance Standards - Province of British Columbia.
- BC Ministry of Education. (2005). Science K to 7: Integrated Resource Package 2005. 32. Retrieved December 1, 2006,
- BC Ministry of Education. (1996). Information Technology K to 7: Integrated Resource Package. Retrieved December 1, 2006, from
- DuFour, R., Burnette, B. (2002) Pull out negativity by its roots. [electronic version] Journal of Staff Development. 23 (2), para. 23.
- Fedorov, A. (2008). On Media Education. Moscow: ICOS UNESCO 'Information for All'.
- International Society of Technology Educators. (2004). National Education Testing Standards – Students. Retrieved November 15, 2006
- Lambert, L. (1998). Building Leadership Capacity. ASCD. Alexandria, Virginia 6, 23.
- Media Awareness Network. (2003). Young Canadians in a wired world; The Students' View. Retrieved on May 11, 2007 from
- Media Awareness Network. (2005a). Young Canadians in a wired world Phase II: Trends and Recommendations. Valerie Steeves. Retrieved on March 19, 2007
- upload/YCWWII_trends_recomm.pdf. Media Awareness Network. (2005b). Young Canadians in a wired world phase ii. ERIN Research Inc. 6. Retrieved on March 19, 2007
- Prensky, M. (2001). Digital Natives, Digital Immigrants. [electronic version] On the Horizon. 9 (5), 1.
- Prensky, M. (2006). Listen to the Natives. [electronic version] Educational Leadership. 63 (4) 8 -13.
- Surrey School District No. 36 (Surrey). (2005) Vision 2010 Strategic Plan. 1 – 4. Retrieved May 8, 2007
- Surrey School District No. 36 (Surrey). (2007) Quick Facts. 1. Retrieved May 10, 2007
- Wilhelm, J. (2000). Literacy by Design. Voices from the middle, A publication of the national council of teachers of English. 7 (3). 4 – 14. Retrieved May 11, 2007
