= Teacher-librarian =

A teacher-librarian, also known as a school librarian or school library media specialist (SLMS), is a certified librarian who also has training in teaching.

According to the American Association of School Librarians (AASL), a division of the American Library Association (ALA), the official title for a certified librarian who works in a school in the United States is school librarian. In Australia, the term teacher-librarian is commonly used.

== Roles ==
According to the American Association of School Librarians, school librarians fulfill five roles: leader, instructional partner, information specialist, teacher, and program administrator.

School librarians may read to children, assist them with schoolwork and book selection, and guide them on which resources to use for their projects, particularly at the secondary school level. Some school librarians work with classes on a "flexible schedule." A flexible schedule means that, rather than having students visit the library at a fixed time each week, the classroom teacher schedules library time when the expertise of the librarian, library and information skills, or library materials are needed as part of a specific learning experience.

In the instructional partner role, school librarians collaborate with classroom teachers to create independent learners by fostering students' research, information literacy, technology, communication, and critical thinking skills. School librarians play a major role in integrating information literacy concepts and skills into the secondary school curriculum and promoting knowledge practices and dispositions related to information literacy within the education system.

As information specialists, school librarians develop a resource base for the school by using the curriculum and student interests to identify and acquire library materials. They also organize and maintain the library collection to promote independent reading and lifelong learning. Materials in the library collection can typically be located using an online public access catalog (OPAC).

This role also involves various activities related to technology, including integrating resources in multiple formats, such as periodical databases, websites, digital video segments, podcasts, blogs and wikis, digital images, and virtual classrooms. School librarians are often responsible for audio-visual equipment and other classroom technologies. In some schools, they may also serve as technology specialists.

As program administrators, school librarians define, lead, and manage library programs by establishing library policies, overseeing the library budget, and planning physical and virtual library spaces. Librarians also maintain the collection by adding resources to support the curriculum and often have tasks such as repairing damaged books and periodicals.

== Certification ==
=== Australia ===
To become an accredited teacher-librarian in Australia, one must be eligible for associate membership of the Australian Library and Information Association (ALIA). This is typically achieved through completing the Master of Education (Teacher-Librarianship) program at Charles Sturt University, which is available to professionally qualified teachers.

=== France ===
In France, to become an accredited teacher-librarian, known as a professeur documentaliste, candidates must pass a state examination, as teachers in France are employed by the government and must hold a master's degree. A government-recognized degree, the "Master Métiers de l'enseignement, de l'éducation et de la formation" (Master MEEF; Master in Teaching, Education, and Training Professions), is available for all teachers, including teacher-librarians. Any person holding a master's degree can take the state exam known as the "Certificat d'Aptitude au Professorat de l'Enseignement Secondaire" (CAPES; Certificate of Aptitude for Secondary Education Teaching). French teacher-librarians work in middle schools and high schools, and their classrooms or libraries are called "documentation and information centers" (CDI: Centre de Documentation et d'Information).

=== Nigeria ===
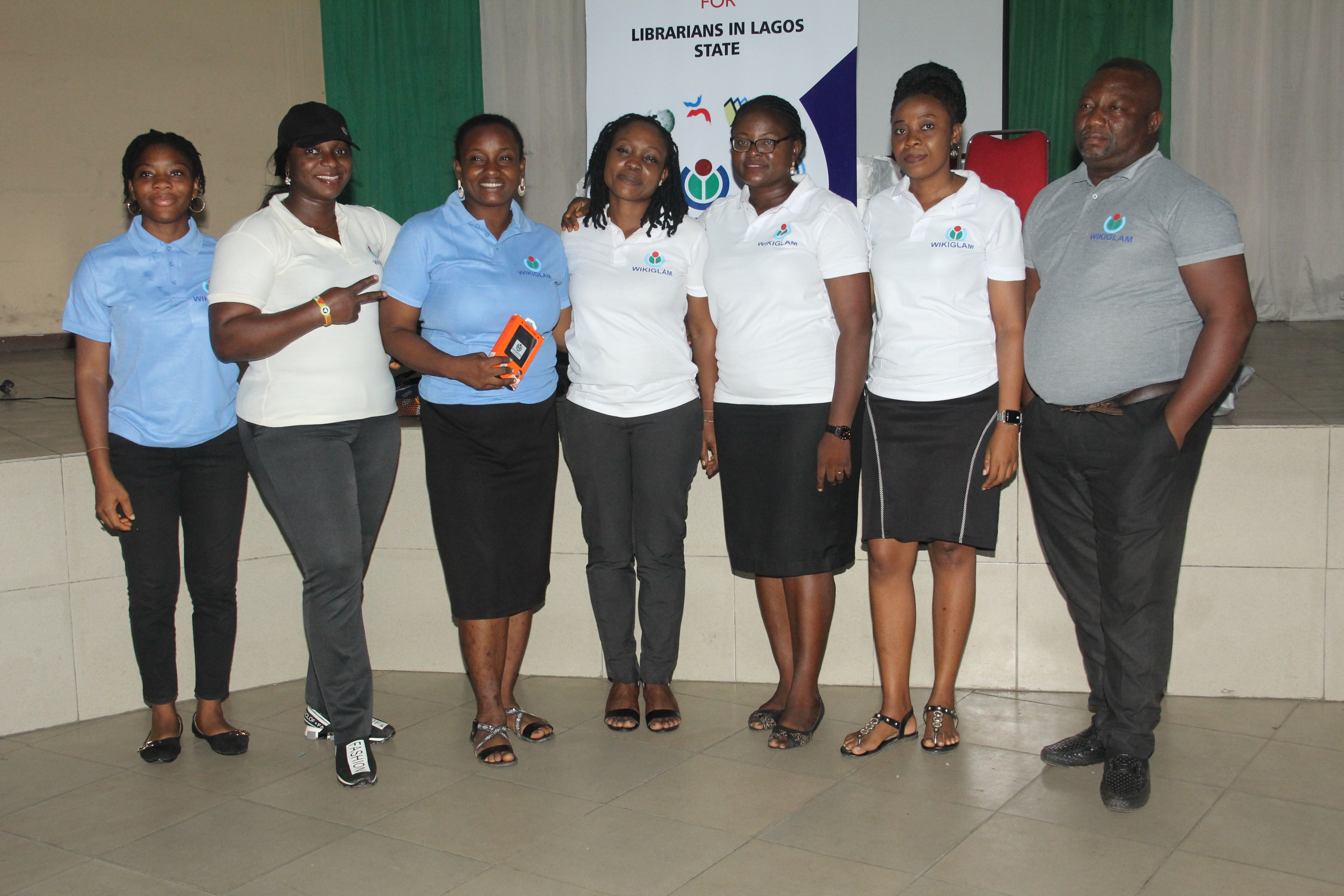
School Librarians in Lagos State

In Nigeria, to qualify as a teacher-librarian, one must possess any of the following qualifications:

- Diploma in Library and Information Science in addition to a teacher training certificate (NCE, B.Ed, M.Ed)
- Nigerian Certificate of Education (NCE) in Library Science and another teaching subject
- Bachelor of Education in Library Science and another teaching subject
- Bachelor of Library and Information Science (BLIS) in addition to a teacher training certificate (NCE, B.Ed, M.Ed)
- Master of Library and Information Science (MLIS) in addition to a teacher training certificate (NCE, B.Ed, M.Ed)

However, in cases where there is no qualified teacher-librarian, teachers who hold a certificate of attendance from a teacher-librarian workshop may be assigned to oversee the school library.

=== United States ===
In the United States, there is no national qualification standard for school librarians; instead, each state sets its own requirements. In many states, a teacher-librarian must hold a baccalaureate degree, a certificate in secondary or elementary education, complete a school library media program, and obtain state certification.

Programs in library science vary among institutions, but state requirements must be met before a library media specialist is permitted to teach. Some school library media specialists hold a Master of Library and Information Science (MLIS) degree, while others do not. In many cases, school librarians who hold an MLS or MLIS degree but do not have the required teaching credentials must first obtain these credentials and gain classroom teaching experience before they are permitted to work as teacher-librarians. Often, additional graduate coursework in library science, focused specifically on school librarianship, is also required.

== Professional organizations ==
Teacher-librarians rely on the support of local, state, national, and international professional organizations for career and professional development, employment opportunities, and funding. Organizations such as the International Association of School Librarianship, the American Association of School Librarians, the School Library Association in the United Kingdom, and the Australian School Library Association maintain websites, publish journals, and sponsor conferences, workshops, and other events that highlight current research and practices in the field.

In the United States, teacher-librarians are also supported by state-level organizations that advocate for teachers within school districts and individual schools. A comprehensive list of these organizations is available from the American Library Association (ALA).

== United States legislation ==
In December 2015, school library programs became eligible for support under the Every Student Succeeds Act (ESSA), a law that allows the use of federal funding for school library programs.

== See also ==
- School library
- fr:Professeur documentaliste (in French)
- Center for Documentation and Information
