= Two in the Wave =

- Film poster
- Directed by: Emmanuel Laurent
- Written by: Antoine de Baecque
- Produced by: Emmanuel Laurent
- Narrated by: Isild Le Besco
- Cinematography: Etienne de Grammont; Nick de Pencier
- Edited by: Marie-France Cuénot
- Distributed by: Les Films du Paradoxe
- Release date: 2 February 2010 (IFFR)
- Running time: 91 minutes
- Country: France
- Languages: French and English

Two in the Wave (French: Deux de la Vague) is a 2010 French documentary film directed by Emmanuel Laurent. The film depicts the friendship between French directors François Truffaut and Jean-Luc Godard.

== Synopsis ==
The film investigates the fruitful and turbulent relationship between the two influential French New Wave directors. The film focuses the success of The 400 Blows and Breathless, the role of Jean-Pierre Léaud in both Truffaut and Godard's films, and the directors' fascination with American film. Two in the Wave ends with the 1973 incident between Godard and Truffaut; Godard wrote a letter to Truffaut criticizing his Oscar-winning film Day for Night. Truffaut responded to the attack by writing a 20-page letter to Godard. The film is narrated by Antoine de Baecque, Truffaut biographer and former Cahiers du Cinéma editor.

== Reception ==
The film have received mixed to positive reviews from critics.

It has earned a 66% rating on Rotten Tomatoes.

It was released on DVD by Kino Lorber on February 22, 2011.

== See also ==
- Hitchcock/Truffaut - the 2015 documentary film based on the book of the same name
- Auteurism
- Andrew Sarris and Pauline Kael-two American film critics who also have turbulent feuds about cinema
