= Antoine de Baecque =

French historian and journalist (born 1962)

- Baecque in 2017
- Born: 14 May 1962 (age 64)
- Occupation: cultural historian; film critic

Antoine de Baecque (born 14 May 1962) is a French cultural historian and film critic. He was editor-in-chief of Cahiers du Cinéma in 1997–1999 and cultural editor of Libération in 2001–2006.

His works include biographies about the French New Wave film directors François Truffaut (1996), Jean-Luc Godard (2010), Éric Rohmer (2014) and Claude Chabrol (2021). He wrote and narrated the 2010 documentary film Two in the Wave, which is about the friendship between Truffaut and Godard.

Baecque's history book about the Festival d'Avignon received the 2007/2008 Prix du meilleur livre sur le théâtre du Syndicat de la critique. He wrote a book about the actress Brigitte Bardot that was published in 2025.

== Selected publications ==
- Andreï Tarkovski (1989)
- Truffaut: A Biography (François Truffaut) (1996; English 1999) – with Serge Toubiana
- Glory and Terror (La gloire et l'effroi) (1997; English 2001)
- La Nouvelle vague : portrait d'une jeunesse (1998)
- Tim Burton (2005; English 2011)
- Histoire du Festival d'Avignon (2007) – with Emmanuelle Loyer
- Godard (2010)
- Éric Rohmer: A Biography (Éric Rohmer : biographie) (2014; English 2016) – with Noël Herpe
- Chabrol (2021)
- Bardot (2025)
