= Réseau Canopé =

French public institution

Réseau Canopé is a French public institution under the supervision of the Ministry of National Education of France. It is the publishing arm of the National Education service, and as such it performs editing, production and dissemination of educational and administrative resources for professional education, both for the ministry and for itself since 1992 (decree n^{o} 92-56). It contributes to the development of information and communication technologies in education (ICTs) as well as artistic and cultural education. Réseau Canopé's baseline is "Le réseau de création et d'accompagnement pédagogiques" ("The network of creation and learning support").

In 2014, it replaced the National Centre for Educational Documentation (Centre national de documentation pédagogique, CNDP) and its regional (CRDP) and departmental (CDDP) branches, with Directions Territoriales and Ateliers Canopé as a unified structure under the name Réseau Canopé (decree 2014-1631, December 26, 2014), totalizing 102 places where teachers and people from the teaching community can borrow resources and attend training sessions. These and a few other institutions formed the Scérén network (Services, Culture, Éditions, Ressources pour l'Éducation nationale: "Services, Culture, Publishing, Resources for National Education").

The network also includes:

- the Centre pour l'éducation aux médias et à l'information (Clémi);
- the National Museum of Education ("Musée national de l'éducation", Munaé).

== History ==
The name "National Centre for Educational Documentation" (Centre national de documentation pédagogique, CNDP) was first given in 1932 by the International Committee on Intellectual Cooperation. It became a public institution in 1954, following the merge of the National Museum of Education (created in 1879) with the central library, sounds archive and film library of the National Education, and the publishing service of the National Education. At that time, regional branches (CRDP) and departmental branches (CDDP) are only branches of the National Center for Educational Documentation (CNDP).

In 1956, CNDP becomes the "National Pedagogical Institute" ("Institut pédagogique national", IPN).

On September 9, 1970, two decrees separate the IPN into two distinct structures: the French Office of Modern Educational Techniques ("Office français des techniques modernes d'éducation", OFRATEME) and the National Institute for Research and Educational Documentation ("Institut national de recherche et de documentation pédagogique", INRDP).

In 1976, the OFRATEME takes the name of the CNDP, and the INRDP becomes the National Institute for Educational Research ("Institut national de recherche pédagogique", INRP).

In 1992, the status of the structure is modified, making CRDP independent structures.

Between 2002 and 2014, the documentation network of the French Ministry of Education was called Scérén. It gathered the CNDP, the Centre de liaison de l'enseignement et des médias d'information, the 30 CRDP and 86 CDDP and some local branches as well. Scérén is also the commercial brand under which the various network branches sold their publications.

On January 1, 2011, CNDP takes charge of the National Museum of Education, managed by the INRP.

In February, 2014, the Scéren-CNDP network becomes the Réseau Canopé. It follows the rules of articles D314-70 et seq. of the French Code of Education.
