= Centre de liaison de l'enseignement et des médias d'information =

The Centre de liaison de l'enseignement et des médias d'information (CLEMI) - (Liaison Centre for Education and Media Information), founded in 1983, is an agency of the French Ministry of Education in charge of media education across the education system. Based in Paris, it is led by Serge Barbet, a former journalist and ministerial advisor and its advisory council and development are chaired by Nathalie Sonnac.

The CLEMI's mission is to teach students how they should approach the media. As a training center, it forms partnerships with professionals from the media industry.

It is associated with the Bibliothèque nationale de France and each year it publishes a press review formed from selected newspaper articles, with the support of the Foundation Varenne. It organizes, with the Varenne Foundation and the Jet d'encre association, a National Competition for school newspapers.
