= Emmanuelle Loyer =

French historian

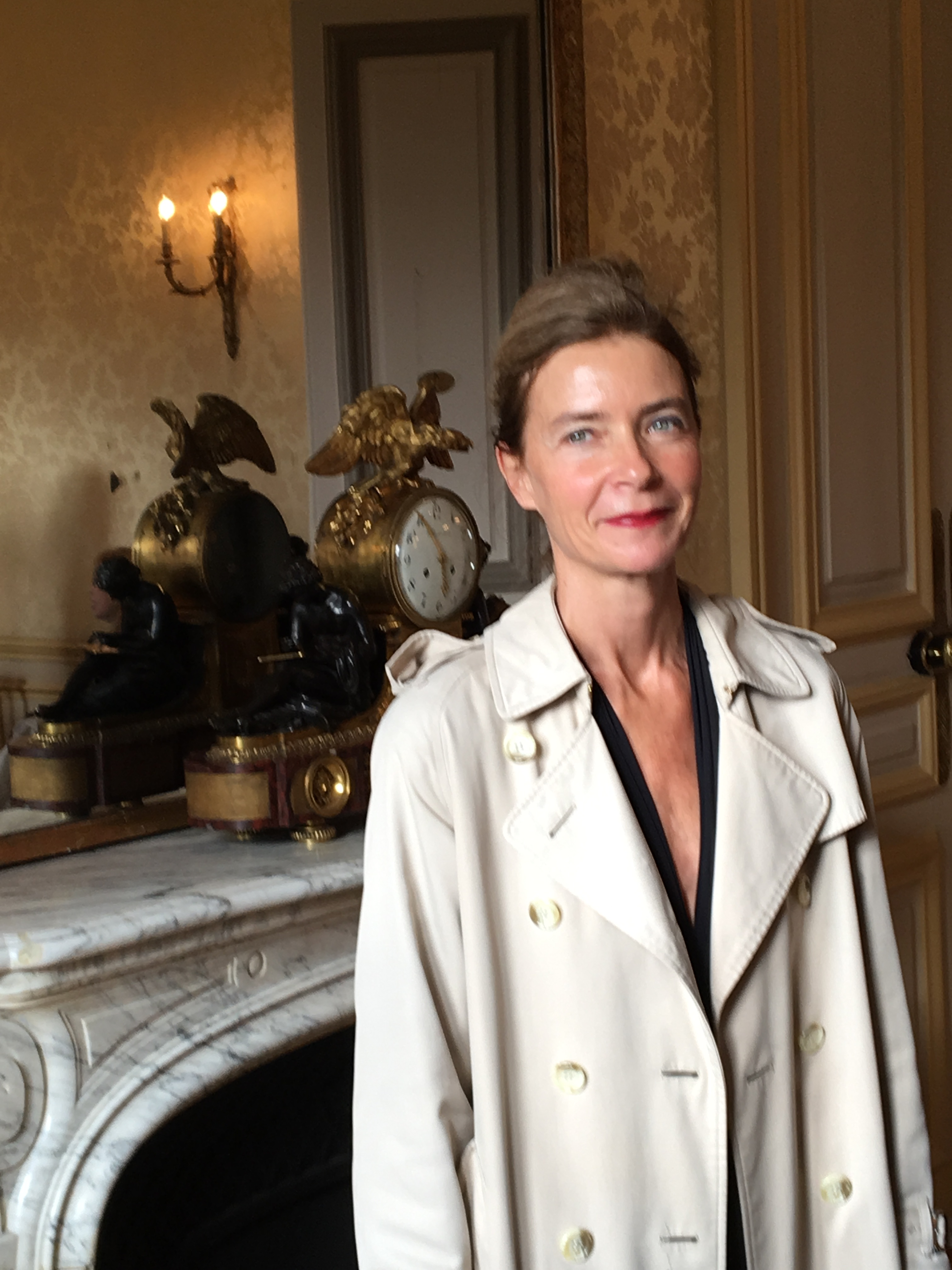
Inage of Emmanuelle Loyer

Emmanuelle Loyer (born, 1968) is a French historian, winner of the prix Femina essai 2015 for her biography of Claude Lévi-Strauss.

Professor of Universities, Emmanuelle Loyer teaches contemporary history at Sciences Po Paris.

== Biography ==
A graduate of the École normale supérieure de Fontenay-Saint-Cloud (L FC 1987) and the Sciences Po de Paris (Public Service track, 1992), Emmanuelle Loyer holds an agrégation in history (1990).

In 1996, she defended her dissertation, titled Théâtre National Populaire (1951–1972): Materials for a Cultural History of Theater, under the supervision of Jean-François Sirinelli at the University of Lille III.

She was granted the right to supervise research in 2004, with a proposal titled Contributions to a Cultural History of France in the 20th Century.

She has published several books with Pascale Goetschel, a historian specializing in theater and the Performing arts in 20th-century France.

She is currently a professor at Sciences Po Paris, where she served as director of doctoral studies in history until 2018.

== Works ==
- 1994: Histoire culturelle et intellectuelle de la France au XXe siècle, with Pascale Goetschel, Paris, Armand Colin, series "Cursus", 187 p. ISBN 2-200-21465-0
- 1997: Le Théâtre citoyen de Jean Vilar. Une utopie d’après-guerre, Paris, Presses Universitaires de France, 253 p. ISBN 2-13-048295-3
- 2005: Histoire culturelle de la France de la Belle époque à nos jours, with Pascale Goetschel, Paris, Armand Colin, series "Cursus", 268 p. ISBN 2-200-26768-1
- 2005: Paris à New York. Intellectuels et artistes français en exil, 1940-1947, Paris, Éditions Grasset and Fasquelle, 497 p. ISBN 2-246-68791-8

- Prix Cazes 2006

- 2007: Histoire du Festival d’Avignon, with Antoine de Baecque, Paris, Éditions Gallimard, 607 p. ISBN 978-2-07-078385-4

- Prix du meilleur livre sur le théâtre du Syndicat de la critique 2007/2008

- 2008: Mai 68 dans le texte, Paris, Éditions Complexe, series "De source sûre", 343 p. ISBN 978-2-8048-0141-0
- 2015: Claude Lévi-Strauss, Paris, Flammarion, series "Grandes biographies", 912 p. ISBN 978-2-08-125752-8

- Prix Femina essai 2015

=== Contribution to collective works ===
- Sous les pavés, la Résistance. La Nouvelle résistance populaire, appropriation et usages de la référence résistante après mai 68, Communication dans les actes du colloque Pourquoi résister ? Résister pour quoi faire?, Centre d'histoire de Sciences Po, CNRS Éditions, 2004.
