= Auve (river) =

- Location within France Location within Grand Est

Location
- Country: France

Physical characteristics
- Source
  - location: Auve
  - coordinates: 49°02′05″N 4°40′38″E
- Mouth: Aisne
  - location: Sainte-Menehould
  - coordinates: 49°05′22″N 4°53′33″E
- Length: 20.2 kilometres (12.6 mi)

Basin features
- Progression: Aisne→ Oise→ Seine→ English Channel
- Tributaries
  - left: Presle, Grand Ruisseau
  - right: Yèvre, Ruisseau de l'Étang

The Auve (French pronunciation: [ov]) is a river of the Marne department in the Grand Est region of France. It is 20.2 kilometres (12.6 mi) long. It has its source at Auve and flows through Saint-Mard-sur-Auve, La Chapelle-Felcourt, Gizaucourt, Voilemont, Dommartin-Dampierre, Argers, Chaudefontaine and Sainte-Menehould, where it meets the Aisne.
