= Yèvre (Marne) =

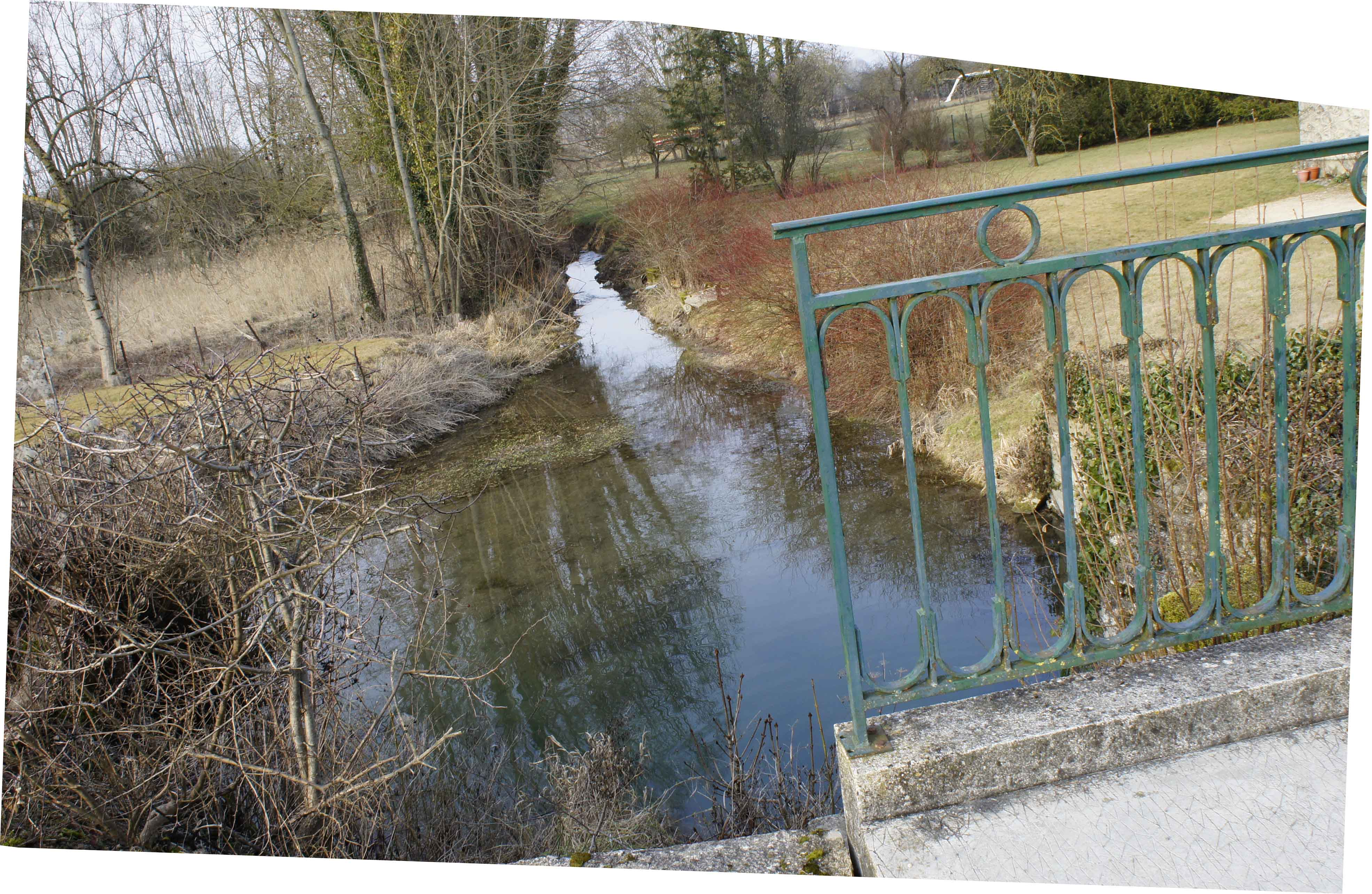
- The Yèvre at Dampierre-le-Château

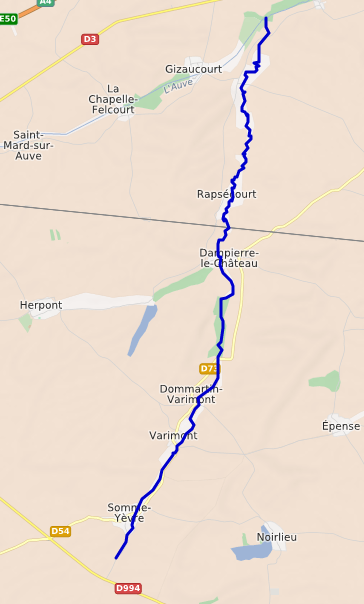

Location
- Country: France

Physical characteristics
- Source
  - location: Somme-Yèvre
- Mouth: Auve
  - coordinates: 49°03′50″N 4°48′28″E
- Length: 17.23 kilometres (10.71 mi)

Basin features
- Progression: Auve→ Aisne→ Oise→ Seine→ English Channel
- Tributaries
  - left: Huye, Rouillat

The Yèvre (French pronunciation: [jɛvʁ]) is a river of the Marne department in the Grand Est region of France. It is 17.23 kilometres (10.71 mi) long. It has its source at Somme-Yèvre and flows through Dommartin-Varimont, Dampierre-le-Château, Rapsécourt, Voilemont and Dommartin-Dampierre.
