= Dommartin =

Dommartin may refer to:

== Places ==
=== France ===
- Dommartin, Ain, Ain département, a former commune
- Dommartin, Nièvre, Nièvre département, a commune
- Dommartin, Doubs, Doubs département, a commune
- Dommartin, Somme, Somme département, a commune
- Dommartin, Rhône, in the Rhône département, a commune

== Switzerland ==
- Dommartin, Vaud, a former municipality in the canton of Vaud

== People ==
- Elzéar Auguste Cousin de Dommartin (1768–1799), French general during the French Revolutionary Wars
- Solveig Dommartin (1961–2007), French actress

== See also ==
- Other French communes:
  - Dommartin-aux-Bois, Vosges département
  - Dommartin-Dampierre, Marne département
  - Dommartin-la-Chaussée, Meurthe-et-Moselle département
  - Dommartin-la-Montagne, Meuse département
  - Dommartin-le-Coq, Aube département
  - Dommartin-le-Franc, Haute-Marne département
  - Dommartin-le-Saint-Père, Haute-Marne département
  - Dommartin-lès-Cuiseaux, Saône-et-Loire département
  - Dommartin-lès-Remiremont, Vosges département
  - Dommartin-lès-Toul, Meurthe-et-Moselle département
  - Dommartin-lès-Vallois, Vosges département
  - Dommartin-Lettrée, Marne département, also a village
  - Dommartin-sous-Amance, Meurthe-et-Moselle département
  - Dommartin-sous-Hans, Marne département
  - Dommartin-sur-Vraine, Vosges département
  - Dommartin-Varimont, Marne département
