= Yèvre =

Yèvre is the name of two rivers in France:

- Yèvre (Cher)
- Yèvre (Marne)
