= Daucourt =

Daucourt is a French surname. Notable people with the surname include:

- Chantal Daucourt (born 1966), Swiss cross-country mountain biker and ski mountaineer
- Gerard Daucourt (born 1941), Swiss bishop

== See also ==
- Élise-Daucourt, commune in the Marne department in north-eastern France
