= Éclaires =

- Commune
- Location of Éclaires
- Location within France Location within Grand Est
- Coordinates: 49°00′03″N 5°00′10″E
- Country: France
- Region: Grand Est
- Department: Marne
- Arrondissement: Châlons-en-Champagne
- Canton: Argonne Suippe et Vesle

Government
  - Mayor (2020–2026): Philippe Bouchez
- Area^{1}: 10.96 km^{2} (4.23 sq mi)
- Elevation: 154 m (505 ft)
- Population (2023): 82
  - Density: 7.5/km^{2} (19/sq mi)
- Time zone: UTC+01:00 (CET)
  - Summer (DST): UTC+02:00 (CEST)
- INSEE/Postal code: 51222 /51800
- ^{1} French Land Register data, which excludes lakes, ponds, glaciers > 1 km^{2} (0.386 sq mi or 247 acres) and river estuaries.

Éclaires (French pronunciation: [eklɛʁ]) is a commune in the Marne department in north-eastern France.

On April 14, 2011, Éclaires was the location of the TGV landspeed record attempt, which it broke with a speed of 574.8 km/h.

== See also ==
- Communes of the Marne department
