= Braux-Saint-Remy =

- Commune
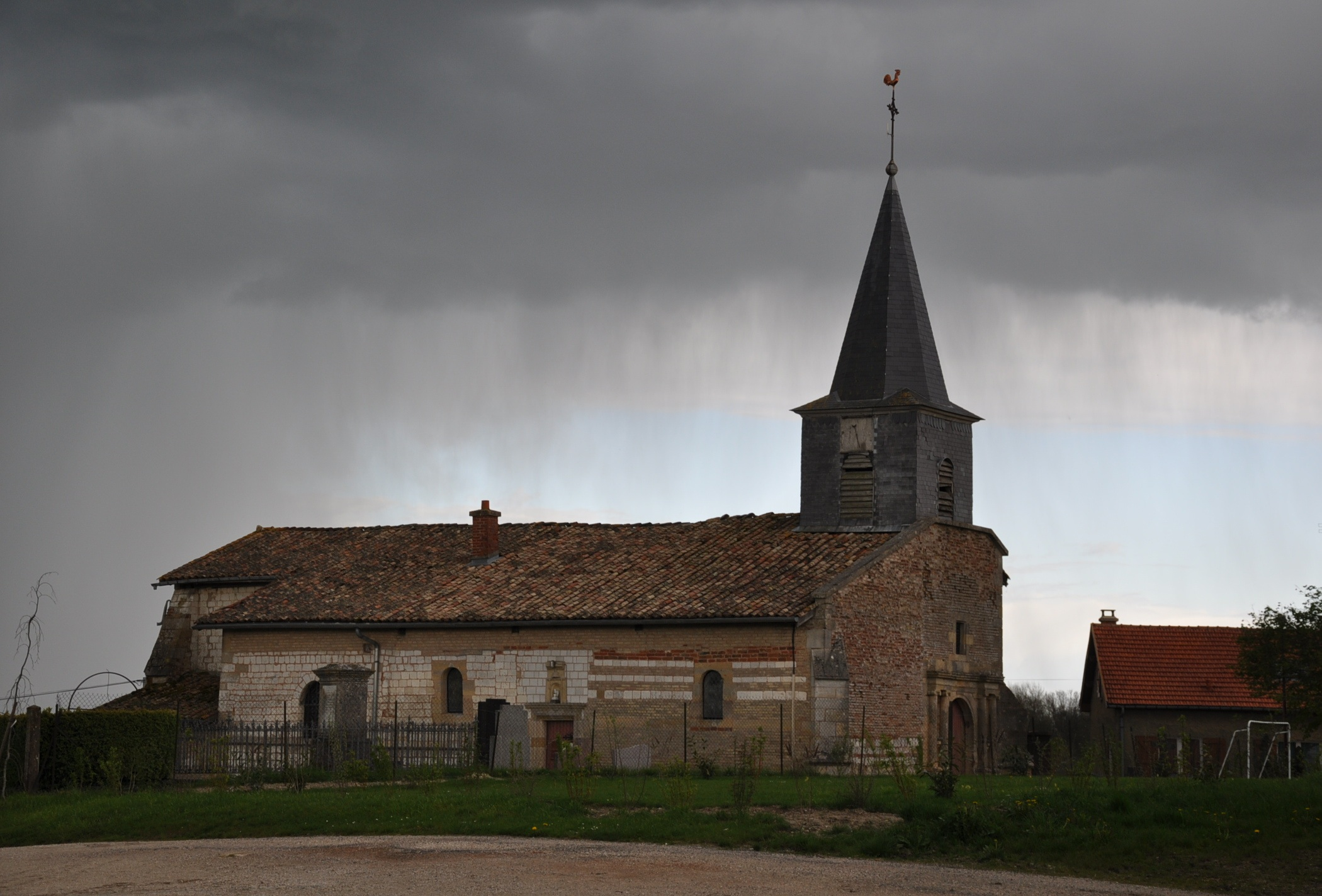
- The church in Braux-Saint-Remy
- Location of Braux-Saint-Remy
- Location within France Location within Grand Est
- Coordinates: 49°01′20″N 4°51′49″E
- Country: France
- Region: Grand Est
- Department: Marne
- Arrondissement: Châlons-en-Champagne
- Canton: Argonne Suippe et Vesle

Government
  - Mayor (2020–2026): Nicolas Lerouge
- Area^{1}: 9.57 km^{2} (3.69 sq mi)
- Elevation: 159 m (522 ft)
- Population (2023): 80
  - Density: 8.4/km^{2} (22/sq mi)
- Time zone: UTC+01:00 (CET)
  - Summer (DST): UTC+02:00 (CEST)
- INSEE/Postal code: 51083 /51800
- ^{1} French Land Register data, which excludes lakes, ponds, glaciers > 1 km^{2} (0.386 sq mi or 247 acres) and river estuaries.

Braux-Saint-Remy is a commune (municipality) in the Marne department in northeastern France. Braux-Saint-Remy is the only village in the commune. The nearest town is Sainte-Menehould at a distance of 10 km.

== Population ==
Historical population
Year	Pop.	±% p.a.
1968	74	—
1975	57	−3.66%
1982	77	+4.39%
1990	86	+1.39%
1999	74	−1.66%
2007	77	+0.50%
2012	98	+4.94%
2017	86	−2.58%
2023	80	−1.20%
Source: INSEE

== See also ==
- Communes of the Marne department
