= Verrières, Marne =

Verrières
- Commune
- Location of Verrières
- Location within France Location within Grand Est
- Coordinates: 49°03′57″N 4°54′32″E
- Country: France
- Region: Grand Est
- Department: Marne
- Arrondissement: Châlons-en-Champagne
- Canton: Argonne Suippe et Vesle
- Intercommunality: Argonne Champenoise

Government
  - Mayor (2020–2026): Jacky Favre
- Area^{1}: 5.8 km^{2} (2.2 sq mi)
- Elevation: 120 m (390 ft)
- Population (2023): 423
  - Density: 73/km^{2} (190/sq mi)
- Time zone: UTC+01:00 (CET)
  - Summer (DST): UTC+02:00 (CEST)
- INSEE/Postal code: 51610 /51800
- ^{1} French Land Register data, which excludes lakes, ponds, glaciers > 1 km^{2} (0.386 sq mi or 247 acres) and river estuaries.

Verrières (French pronunciation: [vɛʁjɛʁ]) is a commune in the Marne department in north-eastern France.

== See also ==
- Communes of the Marne department
