= Florent-en-Argonne =

Florente-en-Argonne
- Commune
- Location of Florente-en-Argonne
- Location within France Location within Grand Est
- Coordinates: 49°08′09″N 4°57′16″E
- Country: France
- Region: Grand Est
- Department: Marne
- Arrondissement: Châlons-en-Champagne
- Canton: Argonne Suippe et Vesle
- Intercommunality: Argonne Champenoise

Government
  - Mayor (2020–2026): Luc Martinez
- Area^{1}: 12.29 km^{2} (4.75 sq mi)
- Elevation: 235 m (771 ft)
- Population (2023): 214
  - Density: 17.4/km^{2} (45.1/sq mi)
- Time zone: UTC+01:00 (CET)
  - Summer (DST): UTC+02:00 (CEST)
- INSEE/Postal code: 51253 /51800
- ^{1} French Land Register data, which excludes lakes, ponds, glaciers > 1 km^{2} (0.386 sq mi or 247 acres) and river estuaries.

Florent-en-Argonne (French pronunciation: [flɔʁɑ̃ ɑ̃.n‿aʁɡɔn], literally Florent in Argonne) is a commune in the longitudinal valley of the Biesme, in the Marne department of north-eastern France.

== See also ==
- Communes of the Marne department
- Forest of Argonne
