= Rouvroy-Ripont =

- Commune
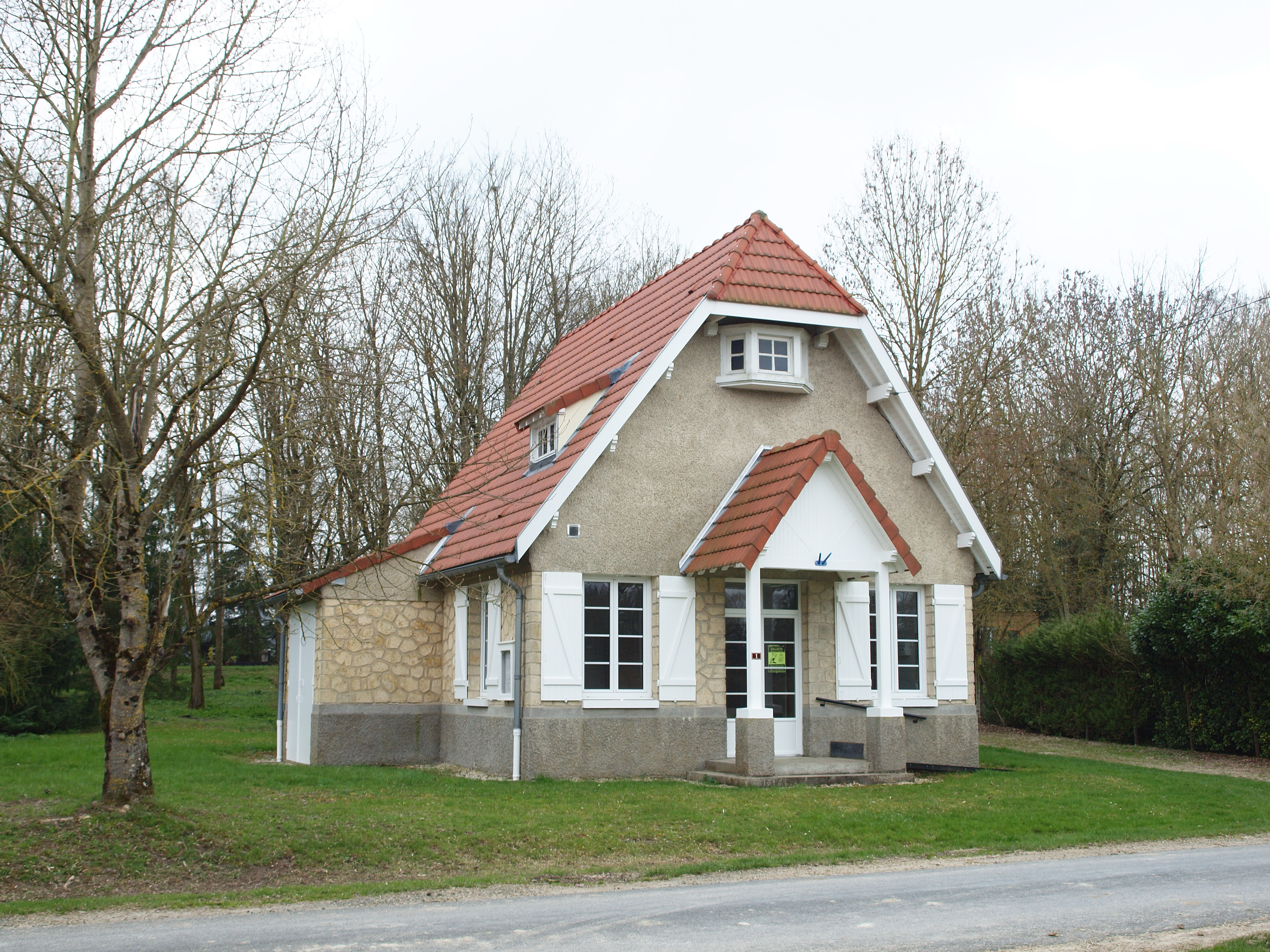
- The town hall in Rouvroy-Ripont
- Location of Rouvroy-Ripont
- Location within France Location within Grand Est
- Coordinates: 49°13′33″N 4°43′55″E
- Country: France
- Region: Grand Est
- Department: Marne
- Arrondissement: Châlons-en-Champagne
- Canton: Argonne Suippe et Vesle
- Intercommunality: Argonne Champenoise

Government
  - Mayor (2020–2026): Catherine Collot
- Area^{1}: 11.77 km^{2} (4.54 sq mi)
- Elevation: 125 m (410 ft)
- Population (2023): 5
  - Density: 0.42/km^{2} (1.1/sq mi)
- Time zone: UTC+01:00 (CET)
  - Summer (DST): UTC+02:00 (CEST)
- INSEE/Postal code: 51470 /51800
- ^{1} French Land Register data, which excludes lakes, ponds, glaciers > 1 km^{2} (0.386 sq mi or 247 acres) and river estuaries.

Rouvroy-Ripont (French pronunciation: [ʁuvʁwa ʁipɔ̃]) is a commune in the Marne department in north-eastern France. With 5 inhabitants as of 2023, it is the smallest commune of the Marne department.

== Population ==
Historical population
Year	Pop.	±% p.a.
1968	12	—
1975	10	−2.57%
1982	8	−3.14%
1990	8	+0.00%
1999	2	−14.28%
2007	9	+20.68%
2012	7	−4.90%
2017	8	+2.71%
2023	5	−7.53%
Source: INSEE

== See also ==
- Communes of the Marne department
