= Saint-Mard-sur-Auve =

- Commune
- Location of Saint-Mard-sur-Auve
- Location within France Location within Grand Est
- Coordinates: 49°02′09″N 4°43′39″E
- Country: France
- Region: Grand Est
- Department: Marne
- Arrondissement: Châlons-en-Champagne
- Canton: Argonne Suippe et Vesle

Government
  - Mayor (2020–2026): Christian Lemery
- Area^{1}: 10.1 km^{2} (3.9 sq mi)
- Elevation: 155 m (509 ft)
- Population (2023): 63
  - Density: 6.2/km^{2} (16/sq mi)
- Time zone: UTC+01:00 (CET)
  - Summer (DST): UTC+02:00 (CEST)
- INSEE/Postal code: 51498 /51800
- ^{1} French Land Register data, which excludes lakes, ponds, glaciers > 1 km^{2} (0.386 sq mi or 247 acres) and river estuaries.

Saint-Mard-sur-Auve (French pronunciation: [sɛ̃ maʁ syʁ ov], lit. 'Saint-Mard on Auve') is a commune in the Marne department in North-Eastern France.

== See also ==
- Communes of the Marne department
