= Maffrécourt =

- Commune
- Location of Maffrécourt
- Location within France Location within Grand Est
- Coordinates: 49°07′05″N 4°49′07″E
- Country: France
- Region: Grand Est
- Department: Marne
- Arrondissement: Châlons-en-Champagne
- Canton: Argonne Suippe et Vesle
- Intercommunality: Argonne Champenoise

Government
  - Mayor (2020–2026): Thierry Bussy
- Area^{1}: 6.74 km^{2} (2.60 sq mi)
- Elevation: 162 m (531 ft)
- Population (2023): 59
  - Density: 8.8/km^{2} (23/sq mi)
- Time zone: UTC+01:00 (CET)
  - Summer (DST): UTC+02:00 (CEST)
- INSEE/Postal code: 51336 /51800
- ^{1} French Land Register data, which excludes lakes, ponds, glaciers > 1 km^{2} (0.386 sq mi or 247 acres) and river estuaries.

Maffrécourt (French pronunciation: [mafʁekuʁ]) is a commune in the Marne department in north-eastern France.

The village is the location of "Le Manoir de Maffrecourt" built in 1830 and of historic importance. In World War I it was a French Military base and famous for the training of the "Harlem Hellfighters" the U.S. Army's 369th Infantry Regiment, popularly known as the “Harlem Hellfighters” was the best known African American unit of World War I. The Manoir de Maffrecourt was renovated in 2004 and is now a "Gites" complex and offers superior accommodation for visitors to the Champagne Ardenne.

== See also ==
- Communes of the Marne department
