= Minaucourt-le-Mesnil-lès-Hurlus =

- Commune
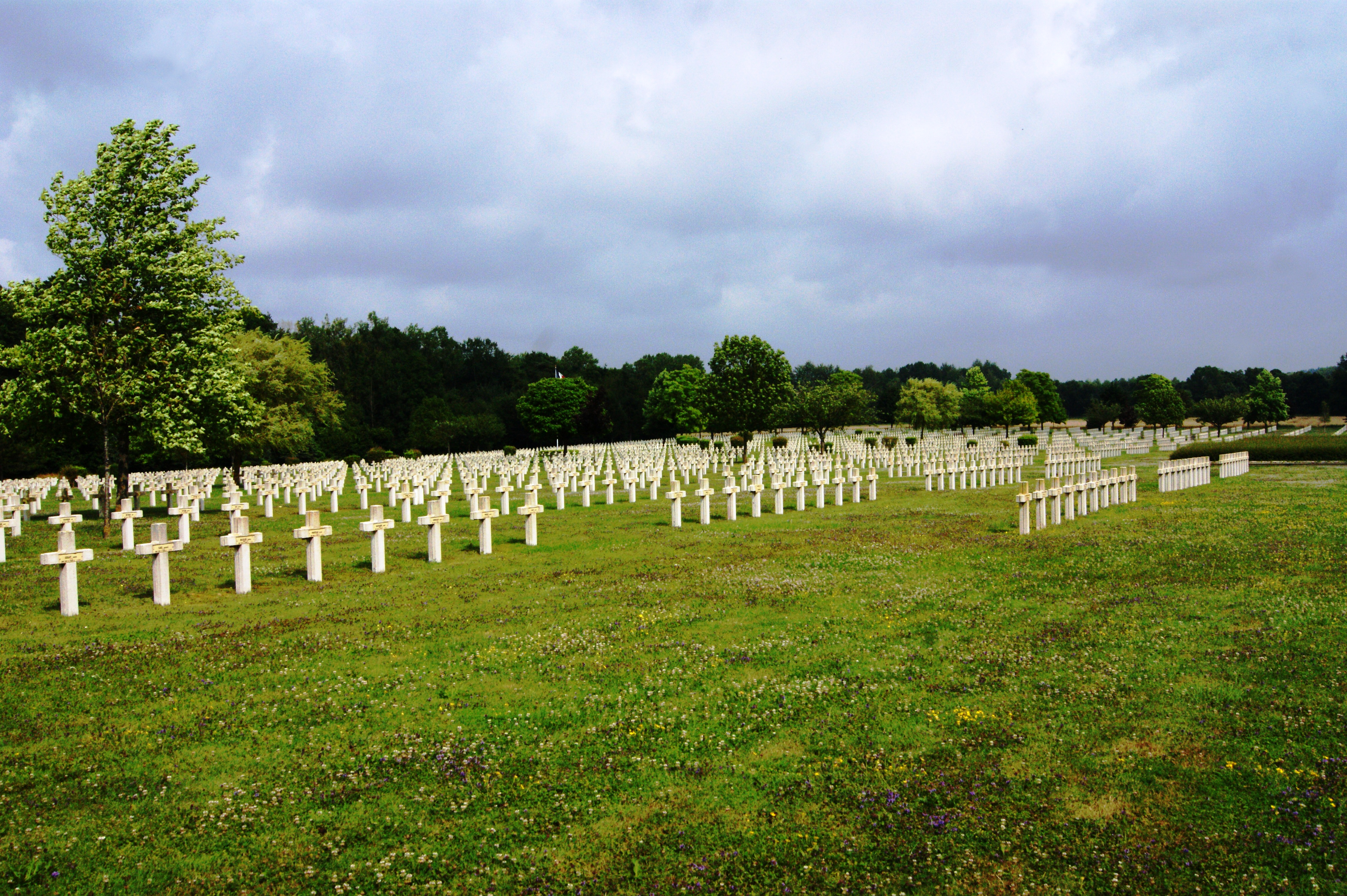
- The National Necropolis of Minaucourt-le-Mesnil-lès-Hurlus
- Location of Minaucourt-le-Mesnil-lès-Hurlus
- Location within France Location within Grand Est
- Coordinates: 49°10′16″N 4°42′57″E
- Country: France
- Region: Grand Est
- Department: Marne
- Arrondissement: Châlons-en-Champagne
- Canton: Argonne Suippe et Vesle
- Intercommunality: Argonne Champenoise

Government
  - Mayor (2020–2026): Denis Senard
- Area^{1}: 23.04 km^{2} (8.90 sq mi)
- Elevation: 142 m (466 ft)
- Population (2023): 46
  - Density: 2.0/km^{2} (5.2/sq mi)
- Time zone: UTC+01:00 (CET)
  - Summer (DST): UTC+02:00 (CEST)
- INSEE/Postal code: 51368 /51800
- ^{1} French Land Register data, which excludes lakes, ponds, glaciers > 1 km^{2} (0.386 sq mi or 247 acres) and river estuaries.

Minaucourt-le-Mesnil-lès-Hurlus (French pronunciation: [minokuʁ lə mɛnil lɛ.z‿yʁly]) is a commune in the Marne department in north-eastern France.

== See also ==
- Communes of the Marne department
