= Courtémont =

- Commune
- Location of Courtémont
- Location within France Location within Grand Est
- Coordinates: 49°08′01″N 4°47′02″E
- Country: France
- Region: Grand Est
- Department: Marne
- Arrondissement: Châlons-en-Champagne
- Canton: Argonne Suippe et Vesle
- Intercommunality: Argonne Champenoise

Government
  - Mayor (2020–2026): Régis Piot
- Area^{1}: 10.57 km^{2} (4.08 sq mi)
- Elevation: 140 m (460 ft)
- Population (2023): 64
  - Density: 6.1/km^{2} (16/sq mi)
- Time zone: UTC+01:00 (CET)
  - Summer (DST): UTC+02:00 (CEST)
- INSEE/Postal code: 51191 /51800
- ^{1} French Land Register data, which excludes lakes, ponds, glaciers > 1 km^{2} (0.386 sq mi or 247 acres) and river estuaries.

Courtémont (French pronunciation: [kuʁtemɔ̃]) is a commune in the Marne department in north-eastern France.

== See also ==
- Communes of the Marne department
