= Noirlieu =

- Commune
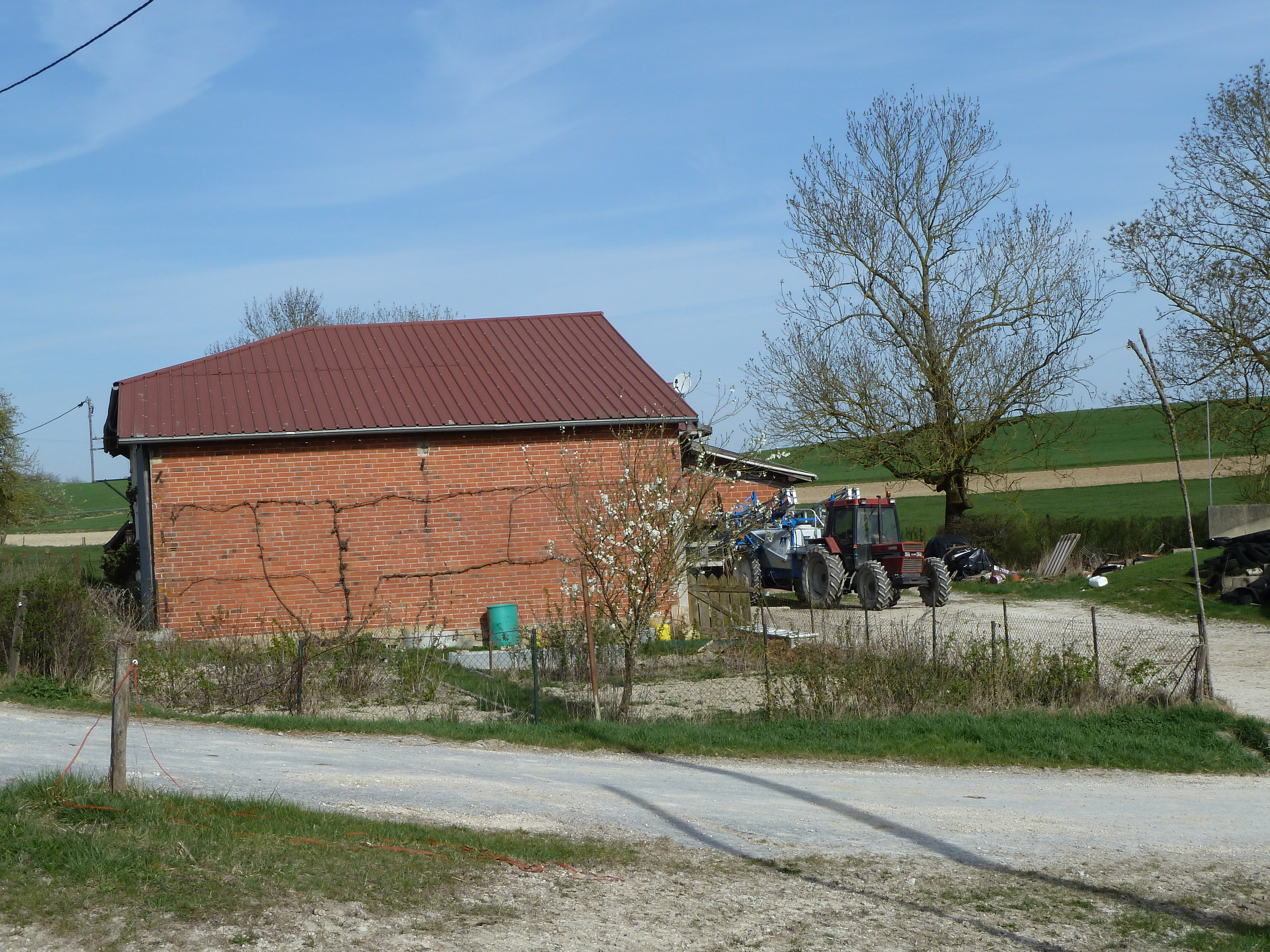
- A farm in Noirlieu
- Location of Noirlieu
- Location within France Location within Grand Est
- Coordinates: 48°56′48″N 4°48′41″E
- Country: France
- Region: Grand Est
- Department: Marne
- Arrondissement: Châlons-en-Champagne
- Canton: Argonne Suippe et Vesle
- Intercommunality: Argonne Champenoise

Government
  - Mayor (2020–2026): Pascal Roth
- Area^{1}: 13.73 km^{2} (5.30 sq mi)
- Elevation: 130 m (430 ft)
- Population (2023): 112
  - Density: 8.16/km^{2} (21.1/sq mi)
- Time zone: UTC+01:00 (CET)
  - Summer (DST): UTC+02:00 (CEST)
- INSEE/Postal code: 51404 /51330
- ^{1} French Land Register data, which excludes lakes, ponds, glaciers > 1 km^{2} (0.386 sq mi or 247 acres) and river estuaries.

Noirlieu (French pronunciation: [nwaʁljø]) is a commune in the Marne department in north-eastern France.

== See also ==
- Communes of the Marne department
