= Belval-en-Argonne =

- Commune
- Location of Belval-en-Argonne
- Location within France Location within Grand Est
- Coordinates: 48°56′59″N 5°00′16″E
- Country: France
- Region: Grand Est
- Department: Marne
- Arrondissement: Châlons-en-Champagne
- Canton: Argonne Suippe et Vesle

Government
  - Mayor (2020–2026): Philippe Gille
- Area^{1}: 12.17 km^{2} (4.70 sq mi)
- Elevation: 136 m (446 ft)
- Population (2023): 44
  - Density: 3.6/km^{2} (9.4/sq mi)
- Time zone: UTC+01:00 (CET)
  - Summer (DST): UTC+02:00 (CEST)
- INSEE/Postal code: 51047 /51330
- ^{1} French Land Register data, which excludes lakes, ponds, glaciers > 1 km^{2} (0.386 sq mi or 247 acres) and river estuaries.

Belval-en-Argonne (French pronunciation: [bɛlval ɑ̃.n‿aʁɡɔn], literally Belval in Argonne) is a commune in the Marne department in northeastern France.

== Population ==
Historical population
Year	Pop.	±% p.a.
1968	104	—
1975	73	−4.93%
1982	56	−3.72%
1990	59	+0.65%
1999	47	−2.49%
2007	59	+2.88%
2012	50	−3.26%
2017	47	−1.23%
2023	44	−1.09%
Source: INSEE

== See also ==
- Communes of the Marne department
