= Poix, Marne =

Poix
- Commune
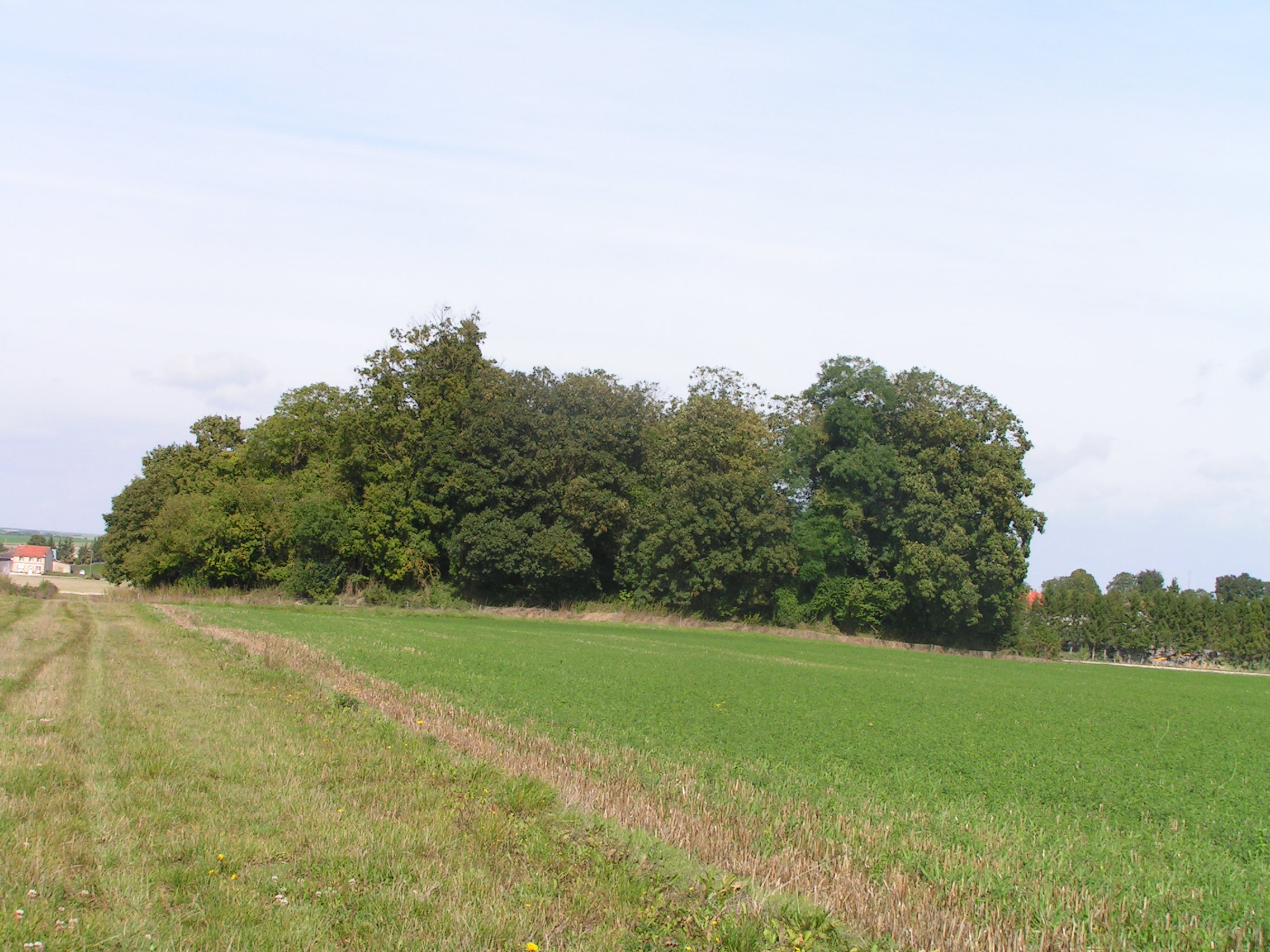
- The Tomb of Théodoric

- Coat of arms
- Location of Poix
- Location within France Location within Grand Est
- Coordinates: 48°57′49″N 4°37′33″E
- Country: France
- Region: Grand Est
- Department: Marne
- Arrondissement: Châlons-en-Champagne
- Canton: Argonne Suippe et Vesle
- Intercommunality: CC de la Moivre à la Coole

Government
  - Mayor (2020–2026): Didier Appert
- Area^{1}: 14.72 km^{2} (5.68 sq mi)
- Elevation: 175 m (574 ft)
- Population (2023): 68
  - Density: 4.6/km^{2} (12/sq mi)
- Time zone: UTC+01:00 (CET)
  - Summer (DST): UTC+02:00 (CEST)
- INSEE/Postal code: 51438 /51460
- ^{1} French Land Register data, which excludes lakes, ponds, glaciers > 1 km^{2} (0.386 sq mi or 247 acres) and river estuaries.

Poix (French pronunciation: [pwa]) is a commune in the Marne department in north-eastern France.

== See also ==
- Communes of the Marne department
