= Laval-sur-Tourbe =

- Commune
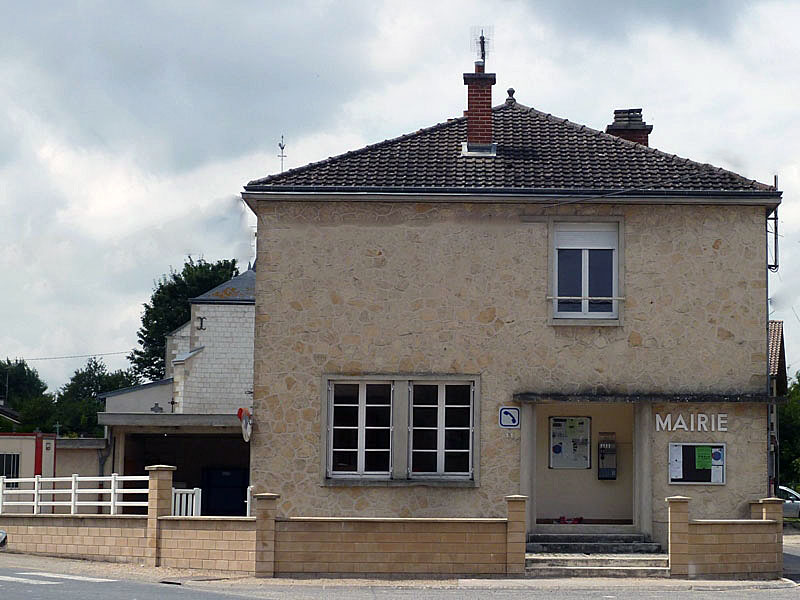
- Town hall
- Location of Laval-sur-Tourbe
- Location within France Location within Grand Est
- Coordinates: 49°08′18″N 4°41′09″E
- Country: France
- Region: Grand Est
- Department: Marne
- Arrondissement: Châlons-en-Champagne
- Canton: Argonne Suippe et Vesle
- Intercommunality: Région de Suippes

Government
  - Mayor (2020–2026): Odile Huvet
- Area^{1}: 14.58 km^{2} (5.63 sq mi)
- Elevation: 143 m (469 ft)
- Population (2023): 52
  - Density: 3.6/km^{2} (9.2/sq mi)
- Time zone: UTC+01:00 (CET)
  - Summer (DST): UTC+02:00 (CEST)
- INSEE/Postal code: 51317 /51600
- ^{1} French Land Register data, which excludes lakes, ponds, glaciers > 1 km^{2} (0.386 sq mi or 247 acres) and river estuaries.

Laval-sur-Tourbe (French pronunciation: [laval syʁ tuʁb]) is a commune in the Marne department in north-eastern France.

== See also ==
- Communes of the Marne department
