= Canton of Argonne Suippe et Vesle =

Canton of France

Coordinates: 49.09°N 4.90°E

The canton of Argonne Suippe et Vesle is an administrative division of the Marne department, northeastern France. It was created at the French canton reorganisation which came into effect in March 2015. Its seat is in Sainte-Menehould.

It consists of the following communes:

1. Argers
2. Auve
3. Belval-en-Argonne
4. Berzieux
5. Binarville
6. Braux-Sainte-Cohière
7. Braux-Saint-Remy
8. Bussy-le-Château
9. Cernay-en-Dormois
10. La Chapelle-Felcourt
11. Les Charmontois
12. Le Châtelier
13. Châtrices
14. Chaudefontaine
15. Le Chemin
16. La Cheppe
17. Contault
18. Courtémont
19. Courtisols
20. La Croix-en-Champagne
21. Cuperly
22. Dampierre-le-Château
23. Dommartin-Dampierre
24. Dommartin-sous-Hans
25. Dommartin-Varimont
26. Éclaires
27. Élise-Daucourt
28. Épense
29. Florent-en-Argonne
30. Fontaine-en-Dormois
31. Givry-en-Argonne
32. Gizaucourt
33. Gratreuil
34. Hans
35. Herpont
36. Jonchery-sur-Suippe
37. Laval-sur-Tourbe
38. Maffrécourt
39. Malmy
40. Massiges
41. Minaucourt-le-Mesnil-lès-Hurlus
42. Moiremont
43. La Neuville-aux-Bois
44. La Neuville-au-Pont
45. Noirlieu
46. Passavant-en-Argonne
47. Poix
48. Rapsécourt
49. Remicourt
50. Rouvroy-Ripont
51. Sainte-Marie-à-Py
52. Sainte-Menehould
53. Saint-Hilaire-le-Grand
54. Saint-Jean-sur-Tourbe
55. Saint-Mard-sur-Auve
56. Saint-Mard-sur-le-Mont
57. Saint-Remy-sur-Bussy
58. Saint-Thomas-en-Argonne
59. Servon-Melzicourt
60. Sivry-Ante
61. Somme-Bionne
62. Sommepy-Tahure
63. Somme-Suippe
64. Somme-Tourbe
65. Somme-Vesle
66. Somme-Yèvre
67. Souain-Perthes-lès-Hurlus
68. Suippes
69. Tilloy-et-Bellay
70. Valmy
71. Verrières
72. Le Vieil-Dampierre
73. Vienne-la-Ville
74. Vienne-le-Château
75. Ville-sur-Tourbe
76. Villers-en-Argonne
77. Virginy
78. Voilemont
79. Wargemoulin-Hurlus
