= La Neuville-aux-Bois =

- Commune
- Location of La Neuville-aux-Bois
- Location within France Location within Grand Est
- Coordinates: 48°58′11″N 4°53′17″E
- Country: France
- Region: Grand Est
- Department: Marne
- Arrondissement: Châlons-en-Champagne
- Canton: Argonne Suippe et Vesle
- Intercommunality: Argonne Champenoise

Government
  - Mayor (2020–2026): Jean-Pierre Mignon
- Area^{1}: 14.48 km^{2} (5.59 sq mi)
- Elevation: 161 m (528 ft)
- Population (2023): 138
  - Density: 9.53/km^{2} (24.7/sq mi)
- Time zone: UTC+01:00 (CET)
  - Summer (DST): UTC+02:00 (CEST)
- INSEE/Postal code: 51397 /51330
- ^{1} French Land Register data, which excludes lakes, ponds, glaciers > 1 km^{2} (0.386 sq mi or 247 acres) and river estuaries.

La Neuville-aux-Bois (French pronunciation: [la nøvil o bwa]) is a commune in the Marne department, Grand Est region, northeastern France.

== See also ==
- Communes of the Marne department
