= Les Charmontois =

- Commune
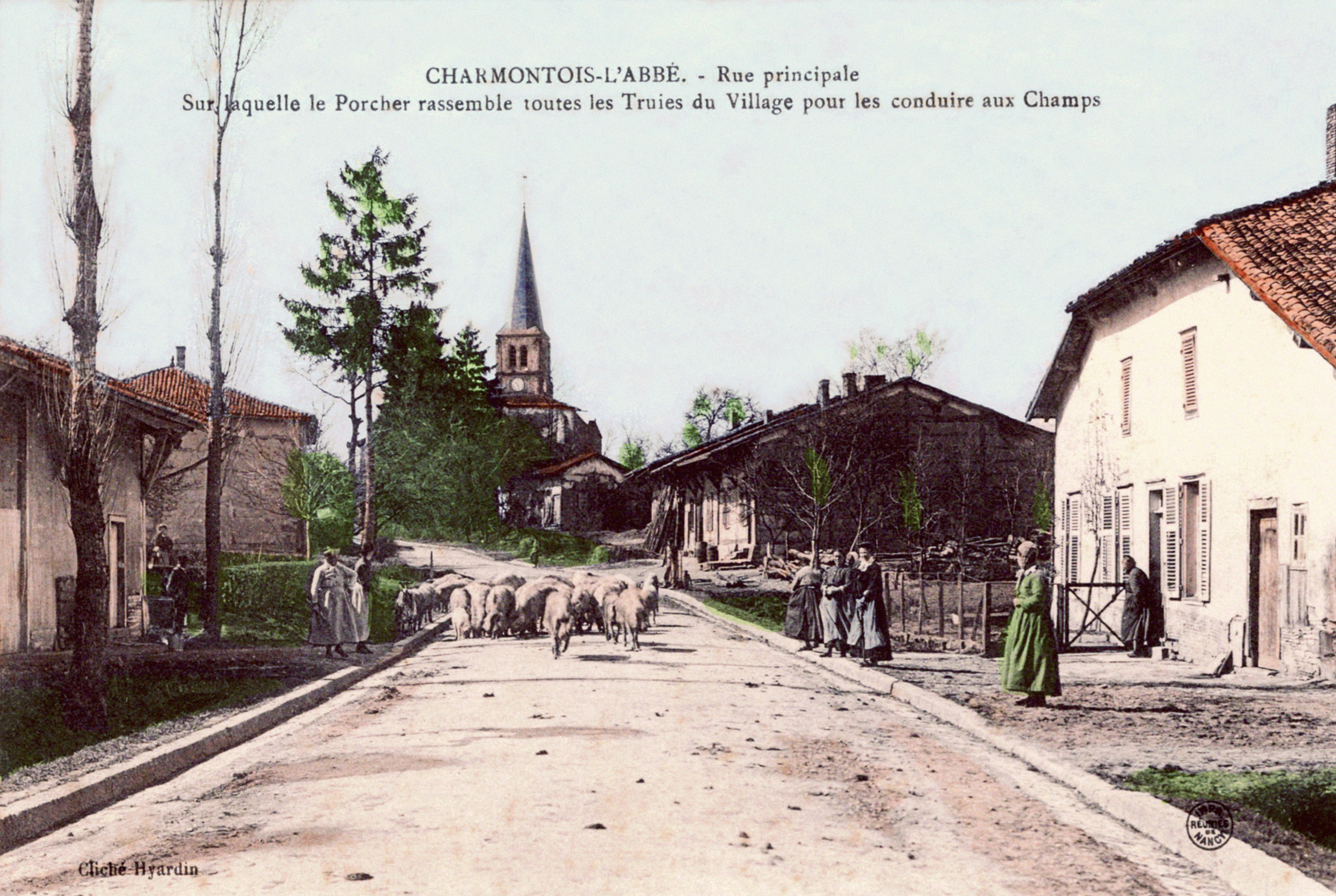
- Charmontois in 1906

- Coat of arms
- Location of Les Charmontois
- Location within France Location within Grand Est
- Coordinates: 48°58′03″N 4°59′59″E
- Country: France
- Region: Grand Est
- Department: Marne
- Arrondissement: Châlons-en-Champagne
- Canton: Argonne Suippe et Vesle

Government
  - Mayor (2020–2026): Dominique Patizel
- Area^{1}: 14.65 km^{2} (5.66 sq mi)
- Elevation: 156 m (512 ft)
- Population (2023): 119
  - Density: 8.12/km^{2} (21.0/sq mi)
- Time zone: UTC+01:00 (CET)
  - Summer (DST): UTC+02:00 (CEST)
- INSEE/Postal code: 51132 /51330
- ^{1} French Land Register data, which excludes lakes, ponds, glaciers > 1 km^{2} (0.386 sq mi or 247 acres) and river estuaries.

Les Charmontois (French pronunciation: [le ʃaʁmɔ̃twa]) is a commune in the Marne department in north-eastern France.

== See also ==
- Communes of the Marne department
