= Berzieux =

- Commune
- Location of Berzieux
- Location within France Location within Grand Est
- Coordinates: 49°09′55″N 4°47′53″E
- Country: France
- Region: Grand Est
- Department: Marne
- Arrondissement: Châlons-en-Champagne
- Canton: Argonne Suippe et Vesle

Government
  - Mayor (2020–2026): Jacques Tilloy
- Area^{1}: 11.67 km^{2} (4.51 sq mi)
- Elevation: 149 m (489 ft)
- Highest elevation: 201 m (659 ft)
- Lowest elevation: 128 m (420 ft)
- Population (2023): 70
  - Density: 6.0/km^{2} (16/sq mi)
- Time zone: UTC+01:00 (CET)
  - Summer (DST): UTC+02:00 (CEST)
- INSEE/Postal code: 51053 /51800
- ^{1} French Land Register data, which excludes lakes, ponds, glaciers > 1 km^{2} (0.386 sq mi or 247 acres) and river estuaries.

Berzieux (French pronunciation: [bɛʁzjø]) is a commune in the Marne department in northeastern France.

== Population ==
Historical population
Year	Pop.	±% p.a.
1968	110	—
1975	102	−1.07%
1982	98	−0.57%
1990	77	−2.97%
1999	83	+0.84%
2007	77	−0.93%
2012	71	−1.61%
2017	74	+0.83%
2023	70	−0.92%
Source: INSEE

== See also ==
- Communes of the Marne department
