= Vienne-la-Ville =

- Commune
- Location of Vienne-la-Ville
- Location within France Location within Grand Est
- Coordinates: 49°10′04″N 4°51′38″E
- Country: France
- Region: Grand Est
- Department: Marne
- Arrondissement: Châlons-en-Champagne
- Canton: Argonne Suippe et Vesle
- Intercommunality: Argonne Champenoise

Government
  - Mayor (2020–2026): Michel Curfs
- Area^{1}: 7.48 km^{2} (2.89 sq mi)
- Elevation: 129 m (423 ft)
- Highest elevation: 170 m (560 ft)
- Lowest elevation: 122 m (400 ft)
- Population (2023): 160
  - Density: 21/km^{2} (55/sq mi)
- Time zone: UTC+01:00 (CET)
  - Summer (DST): UTC+02:00 (CEST)
- INSEE/Postal code: 51620 /51800
- ^{1} French Land Register data, which excludes lakes, ponds, glaciers > 1 km^{2} (0.386 sq mi or 247 acres) and river estuaries.

Vienne-la-Ville (French pronunciation: [vjɛn la vil]) is a commune in the Marne department in north-eastern France.

== See also ==
- Communes of the Marne department
