= Cernay-en-Dormois =

- Commune
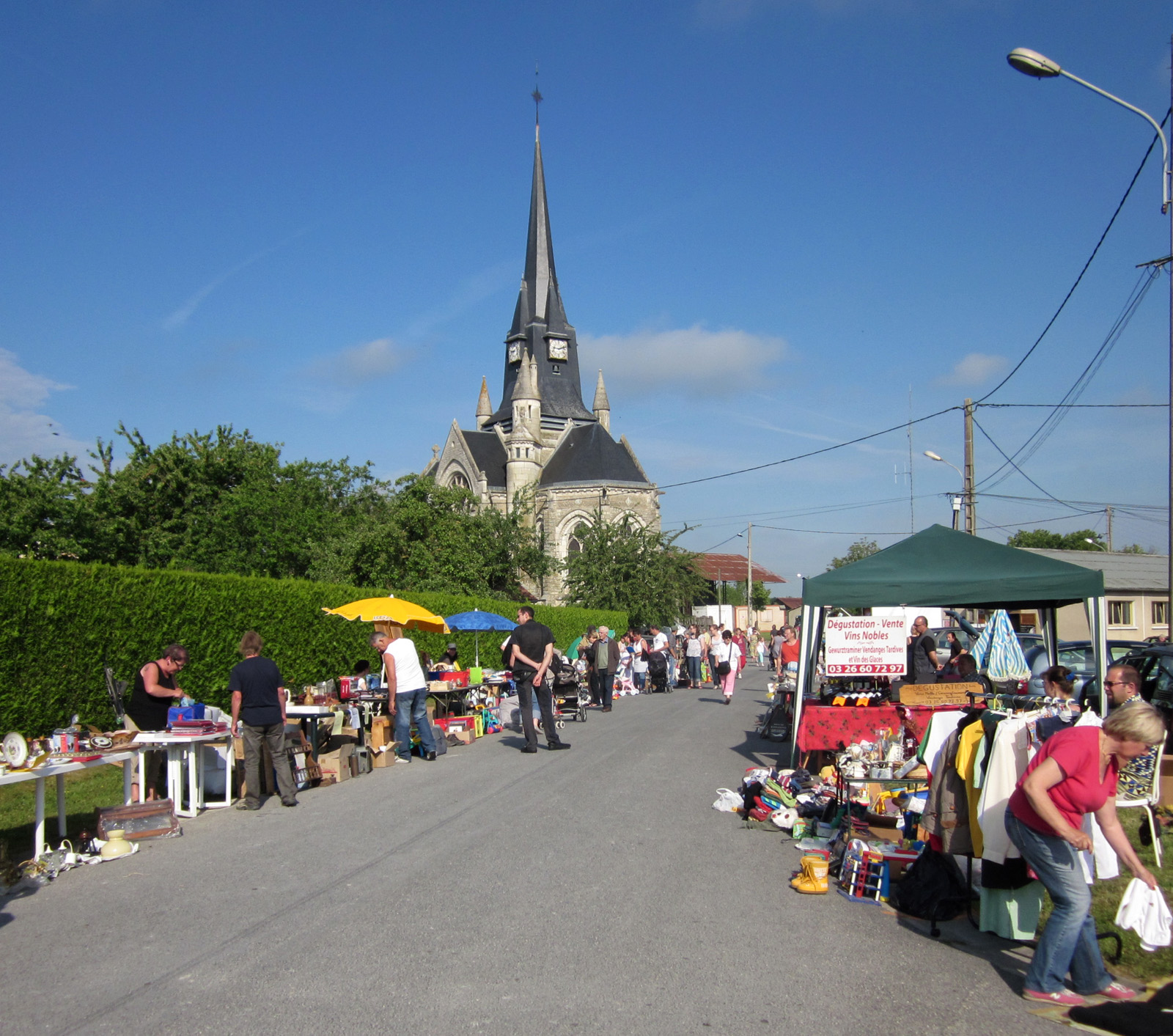
- The church in Cernay-en-Dormois
- Location of Cernay-en-Dormois
- Location within France Location within Grand Est
- Coordinates: 49°13′37″N 4°46′02″E
- Country: France
- Region: Grand Est
- Department: Marne
- Arrondissement: Châlons-en-Champagne
- Canton: Argonne Suippe et Vesle

Government
  - Mayor (2020–2026): Jean-Pierre Chapron
- Area^{1}: 24.82 km^{2} (9.58 sq mi)
- Elevation: 128 m (420 ft)
- Population (2023): 137
  - Density: 5.52/km^{2} (14.3/sq mi)
- Time zone: UTC+01:00 (CET)
  - Summer (DST): UTC+02:00 (CEST)
- INSEE/Postal code: 51104 /51800
- ^{1} French Land Register data, which excludes lakes, ponds, glaciers > 1 km^{2} (0.386 sq mi or 247 acres) and river estuaries.

Cernay-en-Dormois (French pronunciation: [sɛʁnɛ ɑ̃ dɔʁmwa]) is a commune in the Marne department in north-eastern France.

== See also ==
- Communes of the Marne department
