= Herpont =

- Commune
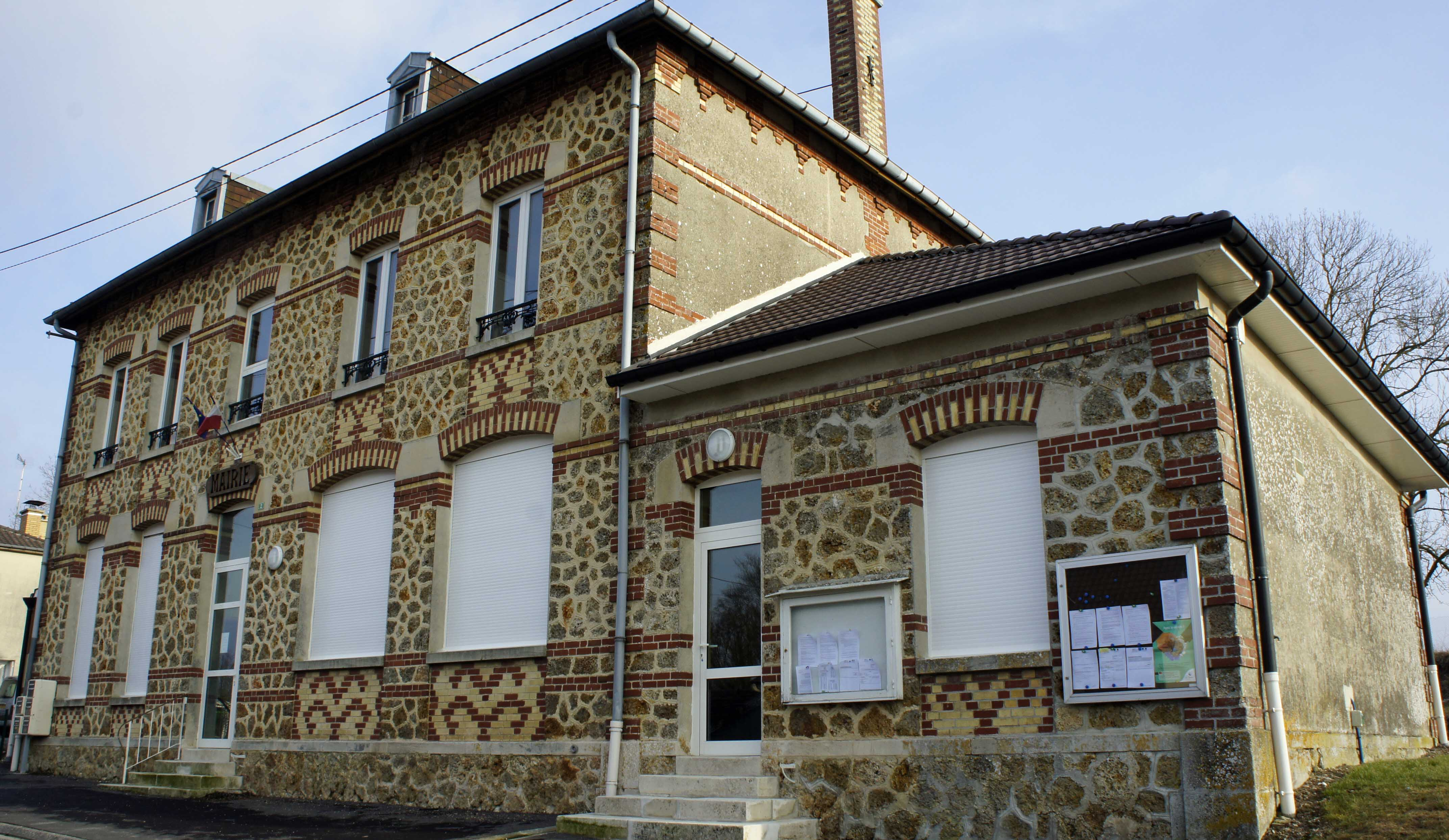
- The town hall in Herpont
- Location of Herpont
- Location within France Location within Grand Est
- Coordinates: 48°59′59″N 4°43′55″E
- Country: France
- Region: Grand Est
- Department: Marne
- Arrondissement: Châlons-en-Champagne
- Canton: Argonne Suippe et Vesle

Government
  - Mayor (2023–2026): Laurette Saint-Juvin
- Area^{1}: 23 km^{2} (8.9 sq mi)
- Elevation: 168 m (551 ft)
- Population (2023): 121
  - Density: 5.3/km^{2} (14/sq mi)
- Time zone: UTC+01:00 (CET)
  - Summer (DST): UTC+02:00 (CEST)
- INSEE/Postal code: 51292 /51460
- ^{1} French Land Register data, which excludes lakes, ponds, glaciers > 1 km^{2} (0.386 sq mi or 247 acres) and river estuaries.

Herpont (French pronunciation: [ɛʁpɔ̃]) is a commune in the Marne department in north-eastern France.

== See also ==
- Communes of the Marne department
