= Saint-Mard-sur-le-Mont =

- Commune
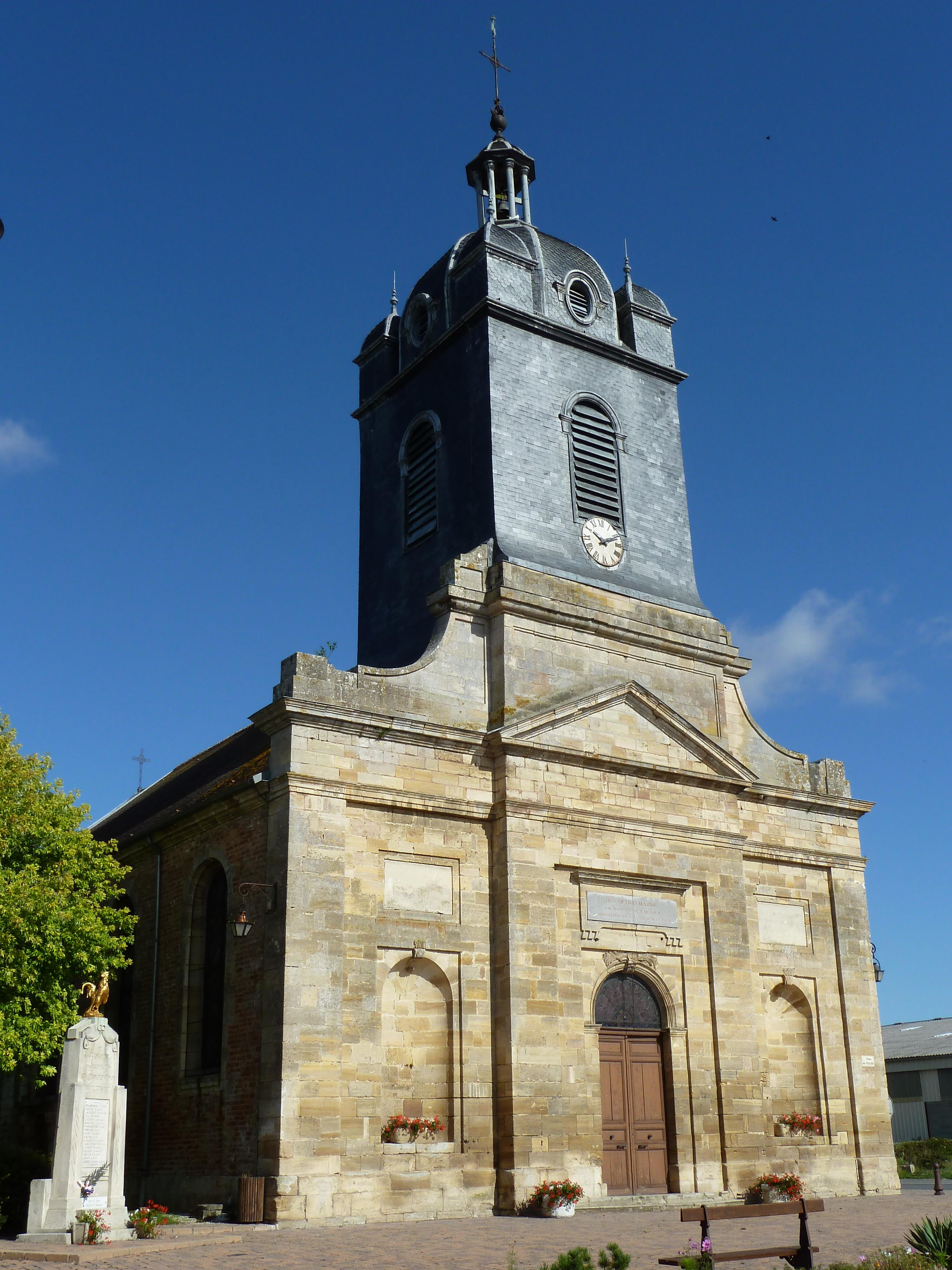
- The church in Saint-Mard-sur-le-Mont
- Location of Saint-Mard-sur-le-Mont
- Location within France Location within Grand Est
- Coordinates: 48°55′21″N 4°50′56″E
- Country: France
- Region: Grand Est
- Department: Marne
- Arrondissement: Châlons-en-Champagne
- Canton: Argonne Suippe et Vesle

Government
  - Mayor (2020–2026): Patrice Roth
- Area^{1}: 13.69 km^{2} (5.29 sq mi)
- Elevation: 165 m (541 ft)
- Population (2023): 114
  - Density: 8.33/km^{2} (21.6/sq mi)
- Time zone: UTC+01:00 (CET)
  - Summer (DST): UTC+02:00 (CEST)
- INSEE/Postal code: 51500 /51330
- ^{1} French Land Register data, which excludes lakes, ponds, glaciers > 1 km^{2} (0.386 sq mi or 247 acres) and river estuaries.

Saint-Mard-sur-le-Mont (French pronunciation: [sɛ̃ maʁ syʁ lə mɔ̃]) is a commune in the Marne department in north-eastern France.

== See also ==
- Communes of the Marne department
