= Le Chemin, Marne =

Le Chemin
- Commune
- Location of Le Chemin
- Location within France Location within Grand Est
- Coordinates: 49°00′19″N 4°58′17″E
- Country: France
- Region: Grand Est
- Department: Marne
- Arrondissement: Châlons-en-Champagne
- Canton: Argonne Suippe et Vesle
- Intercommunality: Argonne Champenoise

Government
  - Mayor (2020–2026): Frédéric Jacquot
- Area^{1}: 6.24 km^{2} (2.41 sq mi)
- Elevation: 169 m (554 ft)
- Population (2023): 63
  - Density: 10/km^{2} (26/sq mi)
- Time zone: UTC+01:00 (CET)
  - Summer (DST): UTC+02:00 (CEST)
- INSEE/Postal code: 51143 /51800
- ^{1} French Land Register data, which excludes lakes, ponds, glaciers > 1 km^{2} (0.386 sq mi or 247 acres) and river estuaries.

Le Chemin (French pronunciation: [lə ʃəmɛ̃]) is a commune in the Marne department in the Grand Est region in north-eastern France.

== See also ==
- Communes of the Marne department
