= Villers-en-Argonne =

- Commune
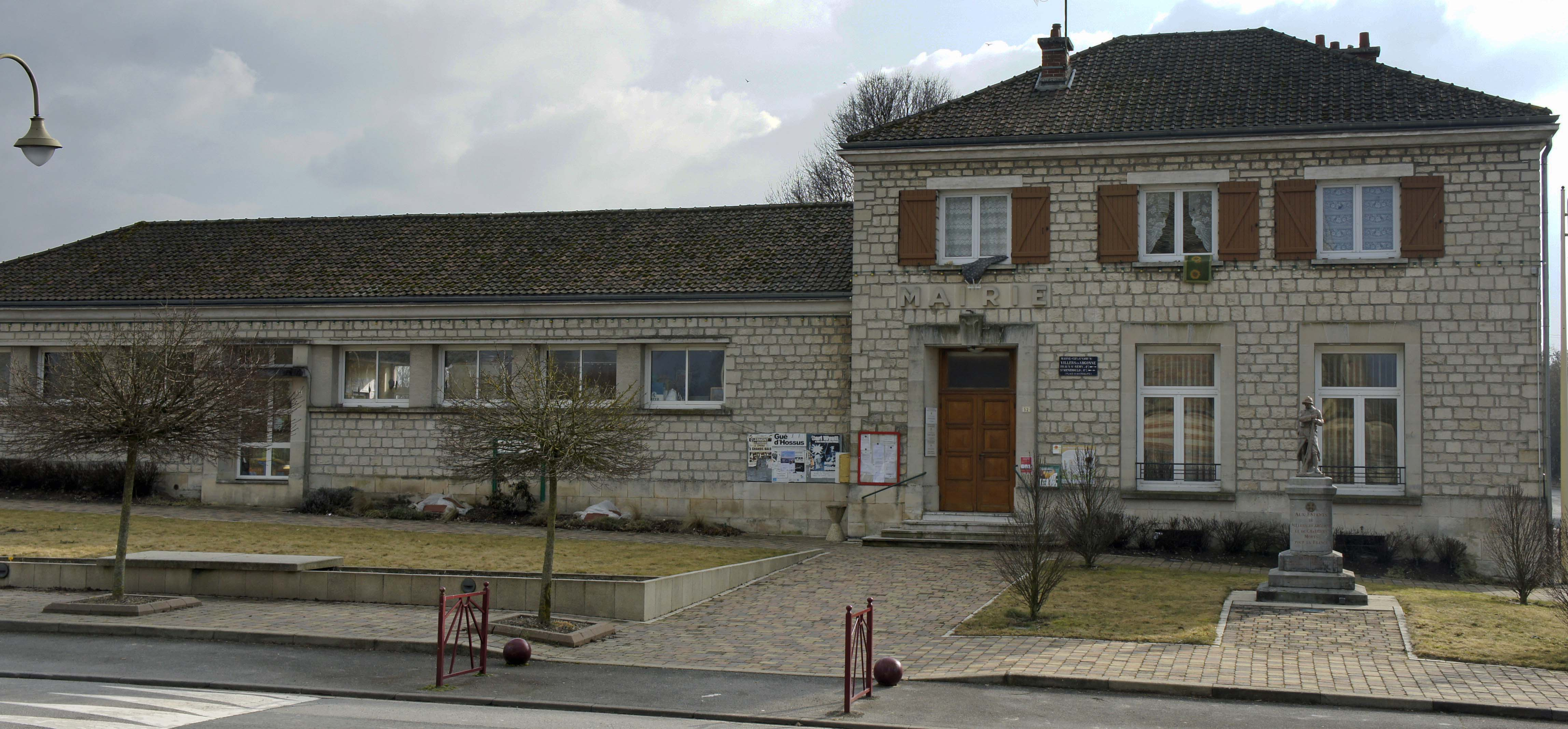
- The town hall in Villers-en-Argonne
- Location of Villers-en-Argonne
- Location within France Location within Grand Est
- Coordinates: 49°01′16″N 4°56′07″E
- Country: France
- Region: Grand Est
- Department: Marne
- Arrondissement: Châlons-en-Champagne
- Canton: Argonne Suippe et Vesle
- Intercommunality: Argonne Champenoise

Government
  - Mayor (2020–2026): Martine Artola
- Area^{1}: 9.57 km^{2} (3.69 sq mi)
- Elevation: 151 m (495 ft)
- Population (2023): 213
  - Density: 22.3/km^{2} (57.6/sq mi)
- Time zone: UTC+01:00 (CET)
  - Summer (DST): UTC+02:00 (CEST)
- INSEE/Postal code: 51632 /51800
- ^{1} French Land Register data, which excludes lakes, ponds, glaciers > 1 km^{2} (0.386 sq mi or 247 acres) and river estuaries.

Villers-en-Argonne (French pronunciation: [vilɛʁ ɑ̃.n‿aʁɡɔn], literally Villers in Argonne) is a commune in the Marne department in north-eastern France.

== See also ==
- Communes of the Marne department
