= Braux-Sainte-Cohière =

- Commune
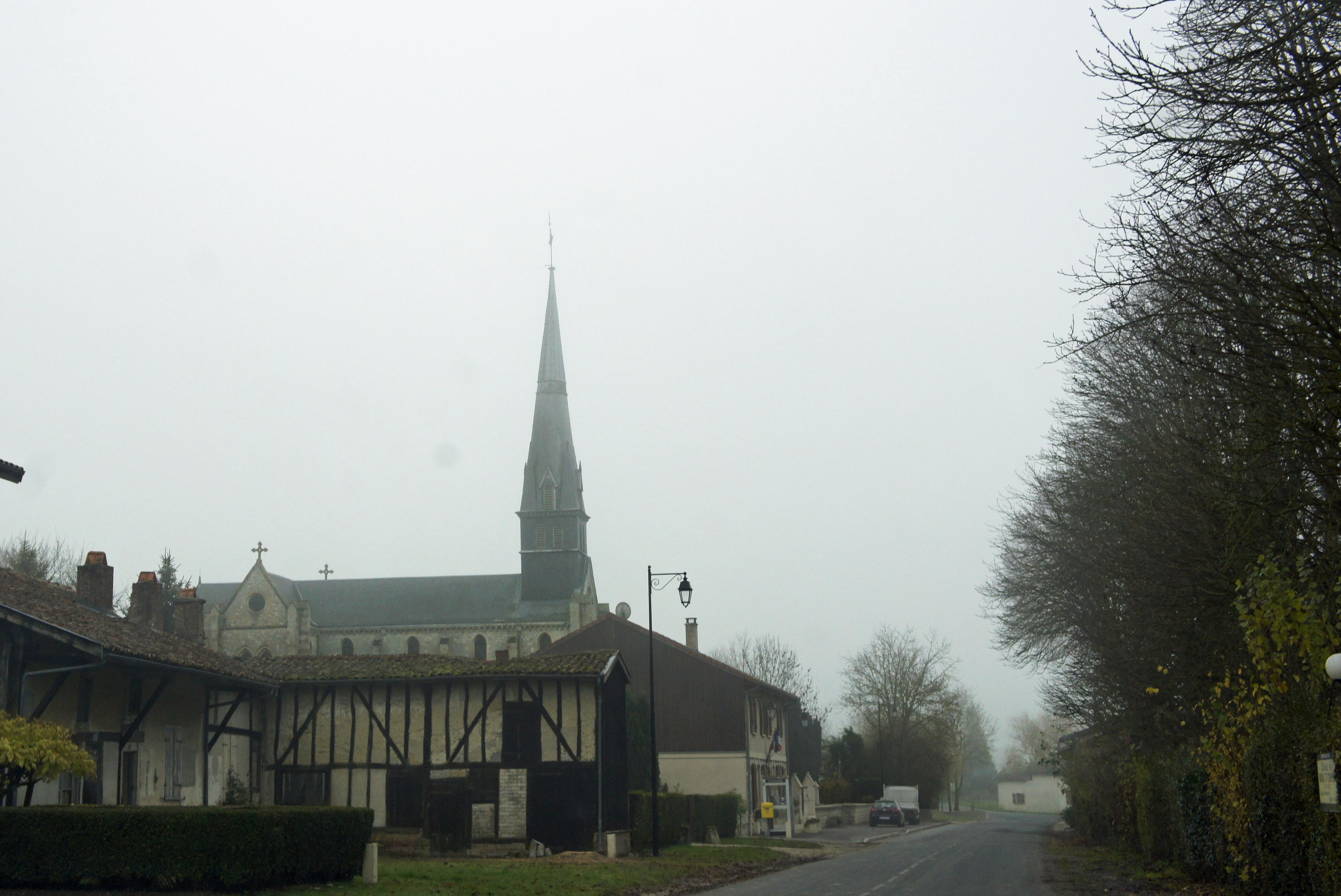
- The church in Braux-Sainte-Cohière
- Location of Braux-Sainte-Cohière
- Location within France Location within Grand Est
- Coordinates: 49°05′36″N 4°49′48″E
- Country: France
- Region: Grand Est
- Department: Marne
- Arrondissement: Châlons-en-Champagne
- Canton: Argonne Suippe et Vesle

Government
  - Mayor (2020–2026): Gérard Marcoux
- Area^{1}: 6.21 km^{2} (2.40 sq mi)
- Elevation: 160 m (520 ft)
- Population (2023): 95
  - Density: 15/km^{2} (40/sq mi)
- Time zone: UTC+01:00 (CET)
  - Summer (DST): UTC+02:00 (CEST)
- INSEE/Postal code: 51082 /51800
- ^{1} French Land Register data, which excludes lakes, ponds, glaciers > 1 km^{2} (0.386 sq mi or 247 acres) and river estuaries.

Braux-Sainte-Cohière (French pronunciation: [bʁo sɛ̃t kɔjɛʁ]) is a commune in the Marne department in northeastern France.

== Population ==
Historical population
Year	Pop.	±% p.a.
1968	85	—
1975	56	−5.79%
1982	62	+1.46%
1990	61	−0.20%
1999	71	+1.70%
2007	82	+1.82%
2012	93	+2.55%
2017	96	+0.64%
2023	95	−0.17%
Source: INSEE

== See also ==
- Communes of the Marne department
