= Tilloy-et-Bellay =

- Commune
- Location of Tilloy-et-Bellay
- Location within France Location within Grand Est
- Coordinates: 49°01′05″N 4°36′52″E
- Country: France
- Region: Grand Est
- Department: Marne
- Arrondissement: Châlons-en-Champagne
- Canton: Argonne Suippe et Vesle
- Intercommunality: Région de Suippes

Government
  - Mayor (2020–2026): Christian Carboni
- Area^{1}: 19.34 km^{2} (7.47 sq mi)
- Elevation: 168 m (551 ft)
- Population (2023): 230
  - Density: 12/km^{2} (31/sq mi)
- Time zone: UTC+01:00 (CET)
  - Summer (DST): UTC+02:00 (CEST)
- INSEE/Postal code: 51572 /51460
- ^{1} French Land Register data, which excludes lakes, ponds, glaciers > 1 km^{2} (0.386 sq mi or 247 acres) and river estuaries.

Tilloy-et-Bellay (French pronunciation: [tilwa e belɛ]) is a commune in the Marne department in north-eastern France.

== See also ==
- Communes of the Marne department
