= Contault =

- Commune
- Location of Contault
- Location within France Location within Grand Est
- Coordinates: 48°54′45″N 4°47′27″E
- Country: France
- Region: Grand Est
- Department: Marne
- Arrondissement: Châlons-en-Champagne
- Canton: Argonne Suippe et Vesle
- Intercommunality: Argonne Champenoise

Government
  - Mayor (2020–2026): Alain Clause
- Area^{1}: 9.62 km^{2} (3.71 sq mi)
- Elevation: 150 m (490 ft)
- Population (2023): 68
  - Density: 7.1/km^{2} (18/sq mi)
- Time zone: UTC+01:00 (CET)
  - Summer (DST): UTC+02:00 (CEST)
- INSEE/Postal code: 51166 /51330
- ^{1} French Land Register data, which excludes lakes, ponds, glaciers > 1 km^{2} (0.386 sq mi or 247 acres) and river estuaries.

Contault (French pronunciation: [kɔ̃to]) is a commune in the Marne department in north-eastern France.

== See also ==
- Communes of the Marne department
