= Passavant-en-Argonne =

- Commune
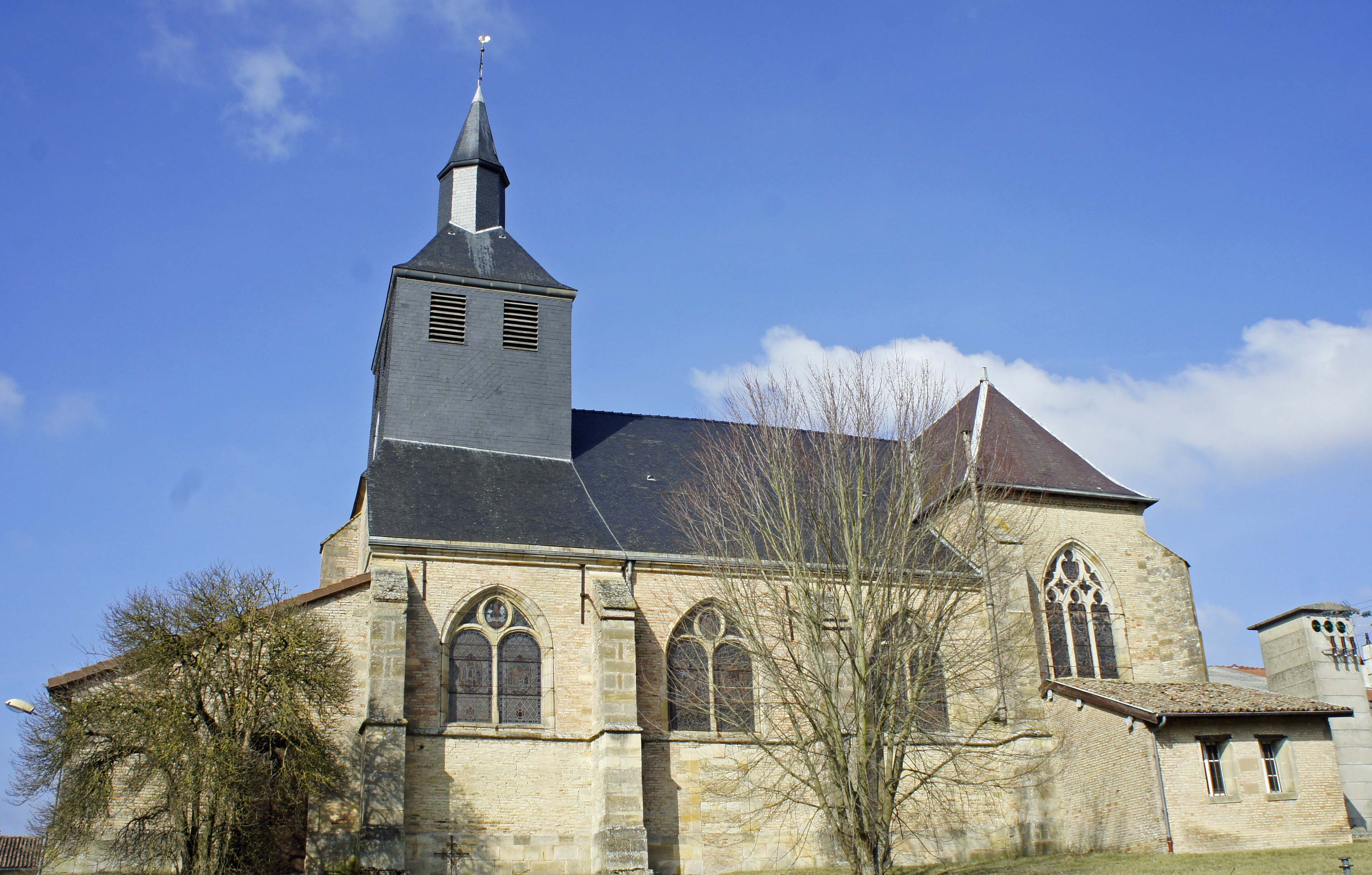
- The church in Passavant-en-Argonne
- Location of Passavant-en-Argonne
- Location within France Location within Grand Est
- Coordinates: 49°01′27″N 5°00′19″E
- Country: France
- Region: Grand Est
- Department: Marne
- Arrondissement: Châlons-en-Champagne
- Canton: Argonne Suippe et Vesle
- Intercommunality: Argonne Champenoise

Government
  - Mayor (2020–2026): Patrice Geant
- Area^{1}: 7.24 km^{2} (2.80 sq mi)
- Elevation: 200 m (660 ft)
- Population (2023): 162
  - Density: 22.4/km^{2} (58.0/sq mi)
- Time zone: UTC+01:00 (CET)
  - Summer (DST): UTC+02:00 (CEST)
- INSEE/Postal code: 51424 /51800
- ^{1} French Land Register data, which excludes lakes, ponds, glaciers > 1 km^{2} (0.386 sq mi or 247 acres) and river estuaries.

Passavant-en-Argonne (French pronunciation: [pasavɑ̃ ɑ̃.n‿aʁɡɔn], literally Passavant in Argonne) is a commune in the Marne department in north-eastern France.

== See also ==
- Communes of the Marne department
