= Gratreuil =

- Commune
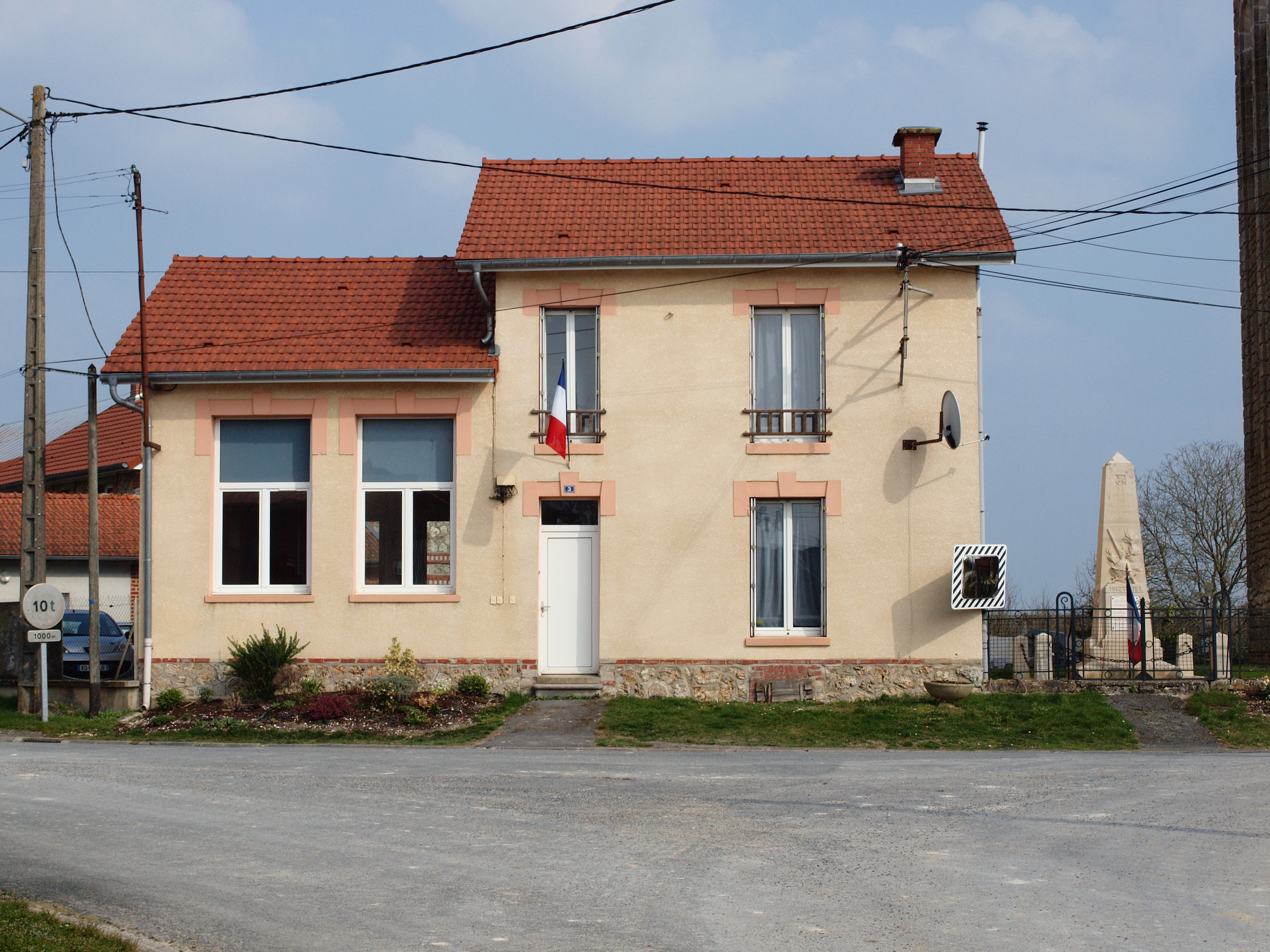
- The town hall in Gratreuil
- Location of Gratreuil
- Location within France Location within Grand Est
- Coordinates: 49°14′49″N 4°41′51″E
- Country: France
- Region: Grand Est
- Department: Marne
- Arrondissement: Châlons-en-Champagne
- Canton: Argonne Suippe et Vesle
- Intercommunality: Argonne Champenoise

Government
  - Mayor (2020–2026): Hubert Roth
- Area^{1}: 4.77 km^{2} (1.84 sq mi)
- Elevation: 108 m (354 ft)
- Population (2023): 21
  - Density: 4.4/km^{2} (11/sq mi)
- Time zone: UTC+01:00 (CET)
  - Summer (DST): UTC+02:00 (CEST)
- INSEE/Postal code: 51280 /51800
- ^{1} French Land Register data, which excludes lakes, ponds, glaciers > 1 km^{2} (0.386 sq mi or 247 acres) and river estuaries.

Gratreuil (French pronunciation: [ɡʁatʁœj]) is a commune in the Marne department in north-eastern France.

== See also ==
- Communes of the Marne department
