= Somme-Vesle =

- Commune
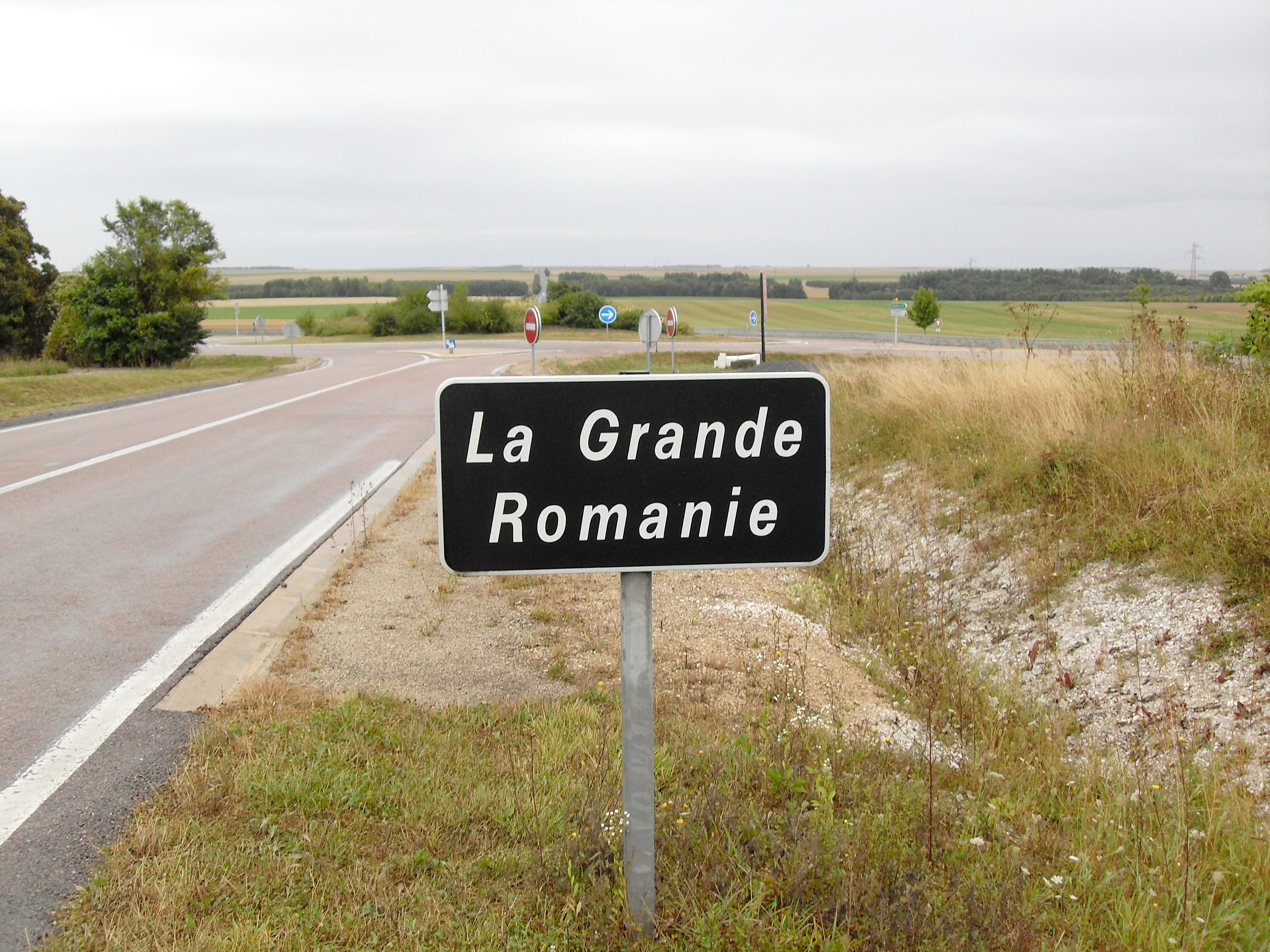
- The road into La Grande Romanie

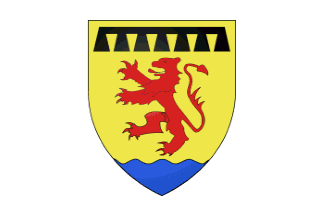
- Flag Coat of arms
- Location of Somme-Vesle
- Location within France Location within Grand Est
- Coordinates: 48°59′09″N 4°35′33″E
- Country: France
- Region: Grand Est
- Department: Marne
- Arrondissement: Châlons-en-Champagne
- Canton: Argonne Suippe et Vesle
- Intercommunality: CC de la Moivre à la Coole

Government
  - Mayor (2020–2026): Freddy Mellet
- Area^{1}: 35.31 km^{2} (13.63 sq mi)
- Elevation: 160 m (520 ft)
- Population (2023): 342
  - Density: 9.69/km^{2} (25.1/sq mi)
- Time zone: UTC+01:00 (CET)
  - Summer (DST): UTC+02:00 (CEST)
- INSEE/Postal code: 51548 /51460
- ^{1} French Land Register data, which excludes lakes, ponds, glaciers > 1 km^{2} (0.386 sq mi or 247 acres) and river estuaries.

Somme-Vesle (French pronunciation: [sɔm vɛl]) is a commune in the Marne department in north-eastern France.

== See also ==
- Communes of the Marne department
