= Hans, Marne =

Hans
- Commune
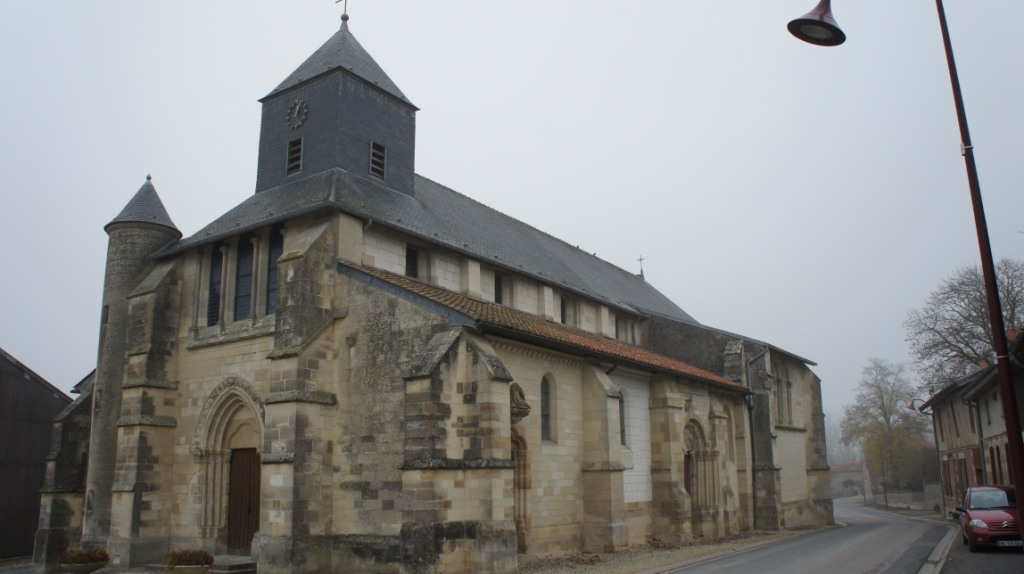
- The church in Hans
- Location of Hans
- Location within France Location within Grand Est
- Coordinates: 49°06′38″N 4°44′59″E
- Country: France
- Region: Grand Est
- Department: Marne
- Arrondissement: Châlons-en-Champagne
- Canton: Argonne Suippe et Vesle
- Area^{1}: 19.5 km^{2} (7.5 sq mi)
- Elevation: 178 m (584 ft)
- Population (2023): 120
  - Density: 6.2/km^{2} (16/sq mi)
- Time zone: UTC+01:00 (CET)
  - Summer (DST): UTC+02:00 (CEST)
- INSEE/Postal code: 51283 /51800
- ^{1} French Land Register data, which excludes lakes, ponds, glaciers > 1 km^{2} (0.386 sq mi or 247 acres) and river estuaries.

Hans is a commune in the Marne department in north-eastern France.

== History ==
During the Battle of Valmy the castle of Hans was the headquarters of Charles William Ferdinand, Duke of Brunswick, commander of the Prussian army.

== Demography ==
Historical population
Year	Pop.	±% p.a.
1968	196	—
1975	171	−1.93%
1982	148	−2.04%
1990	143	−0.43%
1999	133	−0.80%
2007	153	+1.77%
2012	151	−0.26%
2017	146	−0.67%
2023	120	−3.22%
Source: INSEE

== See also ==
- Communes of the Marne department
