= La Croix-en-Champagne =

- Commune
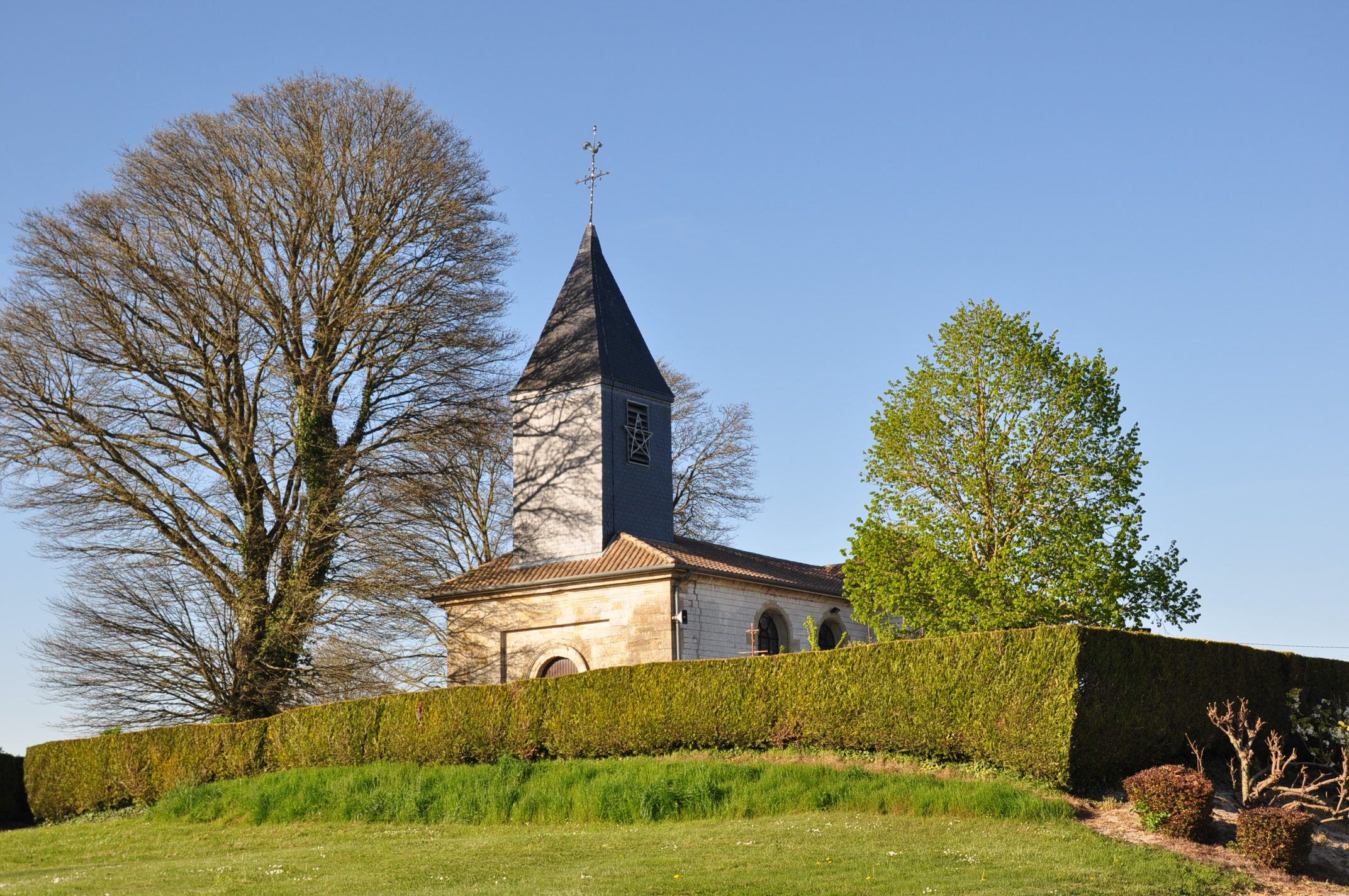
- The church in La Croix-en-Champagne
- Location of La Croix-en-Champagne
- Location within France Location within Grand Est
- Coordinates: 49°04′03″N 4°38′54″E
- Country: France
- Region: Grand Est
- Department: Marne
- Arrondissement: Châlons-en-Champagne
- Canton: Argonne Suippe et Vesle
- Intercommunality: Région de Suippes

Government
  - Mayor (2020–2026): Arnaud Giboni
- Area^{1}: 16.58 km^{2} (6.40 sq mi)
- Elevation: 200 m (660 ft)
- Population (2023): 88
  - Density: 5.3/km^{2} (14/sq mi)
- Time zone: UTC+01:00 (CET)
  - Summer (DST): UTC+02:00 (CEST)
- INSEE/Postal code: 51197 /51600
- ^{1} French Land Register data, which excludes lakes, ponds, glaciers > 1 km^{2} (0.386 sq mi or 247 acres) and river estuaries.

La Croix-en-Champagne (French pronunciation: [la kʁwa ɑ̃ ʃɑ̃paɲ]) is a commune in the Marne department in the Grand Est region in north-eastern France.

== See also ==
- Communes of the Marne department
