= Dommartin-sous-Hans =

- Commune
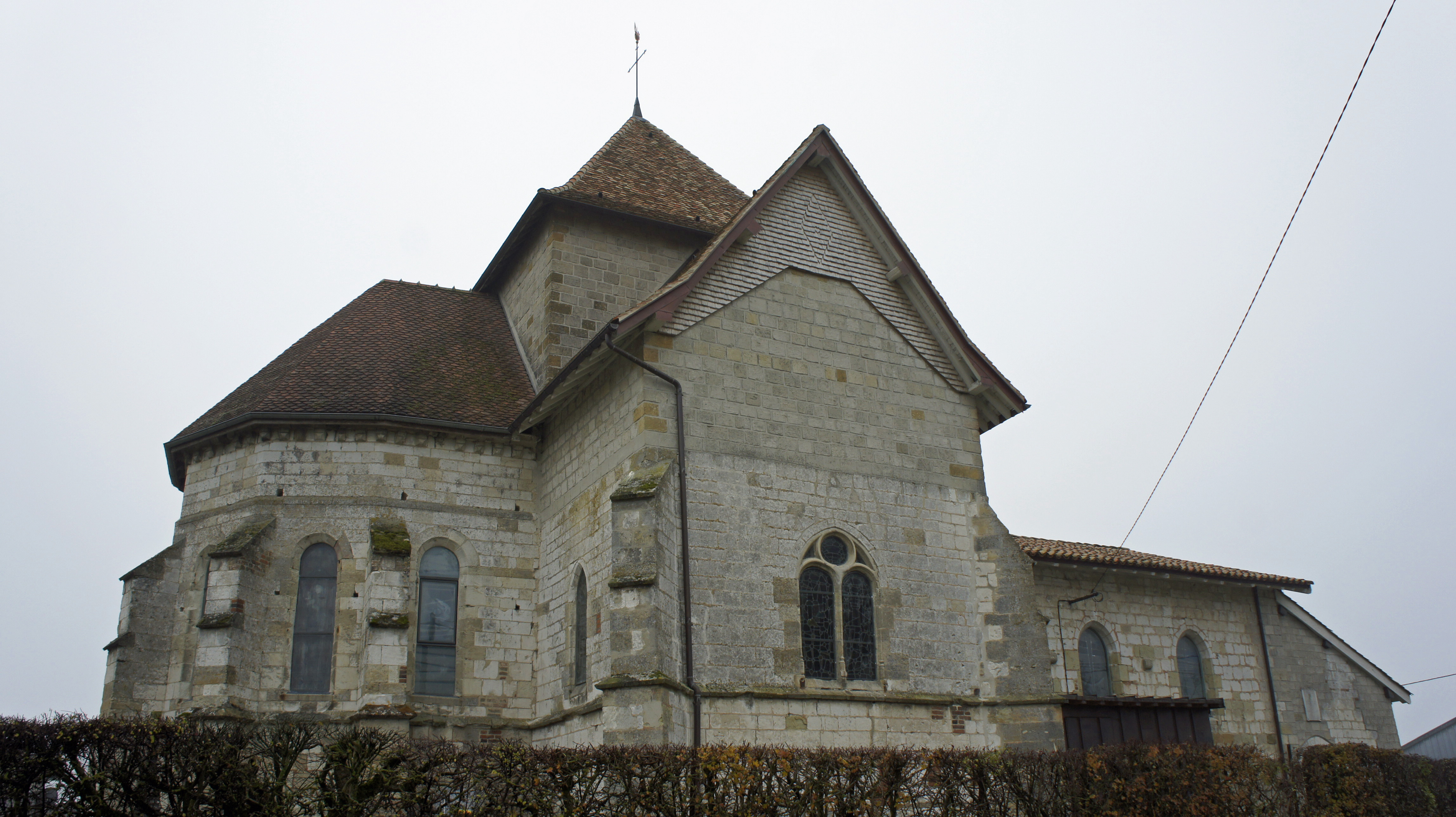
- The church in Dommartin-sous-Hans
- Location of Dommartin-sous-Hans
- Location within France Location within Grand Est
- Coordinates: 49°07′39″N 4°47′09″E
- Country: France
- Region: Grand Est
- Department: Marne
- Arrondissement: Châlons-en-Champagne
- Canton: Argonne Suippe et Vesle
- Intercommunality: Argonne Champenoise

Government
  - Mayor (2020–2026): Nathalie Rostoucher
- Area^{1}: 6.49 km^{2} (2.51 sq mi)
- Elevation: 153 m (502 ft)
- Population (2023): 45
  - Density: 6.9/km^{2} (18/sq mi)
- Time zone: UTC+01:00 (CET)
  - Summer (DST): UTC+02:00 (CEST)
- INSEE/Postal code: 51213 /51800
- ^{1} French Land Register data, which excludes lakes, ponds, glaciers > 1 km^{2} (0.386 sq mi or 247 acres) and river estuaries.

Dommartin-sous-Hans is a commune in the Marne department in north-eastern France.

== Demography ==
Historical population
| Year | Pop. | ±% p.a. |
|---|---|---|
| 1968 | 82 | — |
| 1975 | 75 | −1.27% |
| 1982 | 70 | −0.98% |
| 1990 | 53 | −3.42% |
| 1999 | 55 | +0.41% |
| 2007 | 53 | −0.46% |
| 2012 | 51 | −0.77% |
| 2017 | 57 | +2.25% |
| 2023 | 45 | −3.86% |
Source: INSEE

== See also ==
- Communes of the Marne department
