= Élise-Daucourt =

- Commune
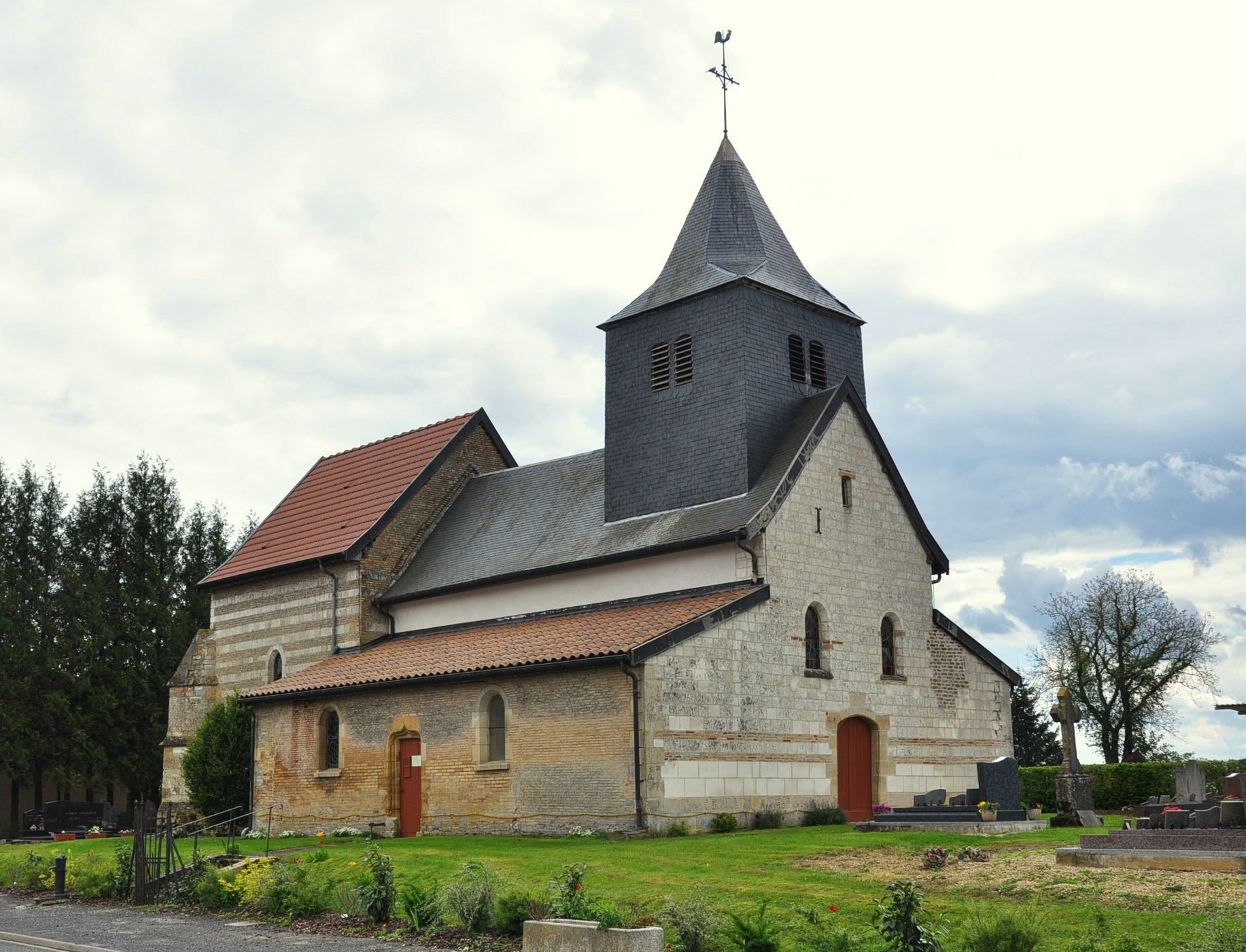
- St. Nicholas' Church in Daucourt
- Location of Élise-Daucourt
- Location within France Location within Grand Est
- Coordinates: 49°02′48″N 4°52′04″E
- Country: France
- Region: Grand Est
- Department: Marne
- Arrondissement: Châlons-en-Champagne
- Canton: Argonne Suippe et Vesle
- Intercommunality: Argonne Champenoise

Government
  - Mayor (2020–2026): Guillaume Achard-Corompt
- Area^{1}: 15.32 km^{2} (5.92 sq mi)
- Elevation: 184 m (604 ft)
- Population (2023): 85
  - Density: 5.5/km^{2} (14/sq mi)
- Time zone: UTC+01:00 (CET)
  - Summer (DST): UTC+02:00 (CEST)
- INSEE/Postal code: 51228 /51800
- ^{1} French Land Register data, which excludes lakes, ponds, glaciers > 1 km^{2} (0.386 sq mi or 247 acres) and river estuaries.

Élise-Daucourt (French pronunciation: [eliz dokuʁ]) is a commune in the Marne department in north-eastern France. The commune consists of 2 villages, Élise and Daucourt, which are 1 mile apart. Both villages were separate communes until 1965, when they merged. Since the merger Élise is often called Élise-Daucourt. Both villages lie about 6 km south of Sainte-Menehould, the nearest regional town.

== See also ==
- Communes of the Marne department
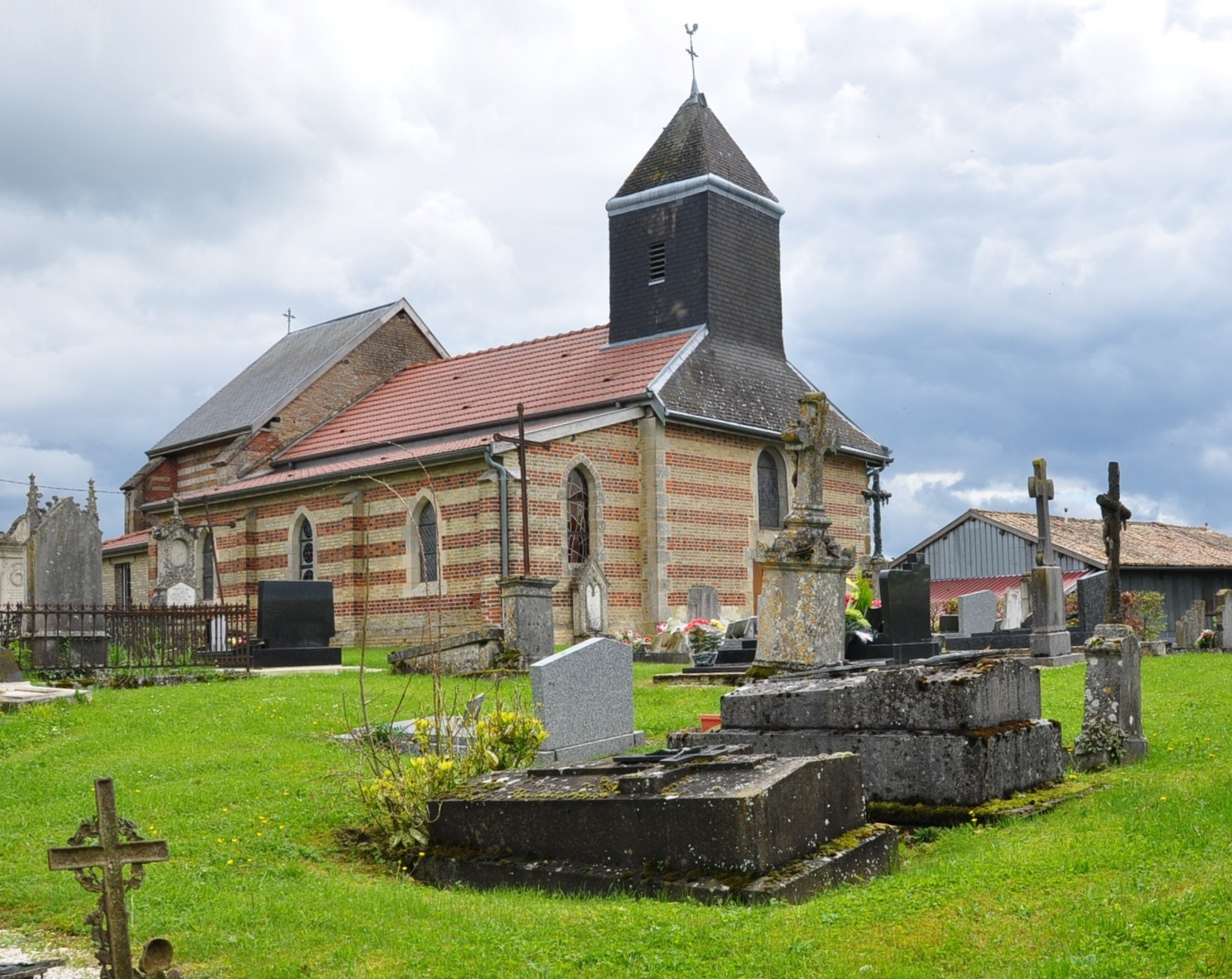
Church of St. Julian in Élise

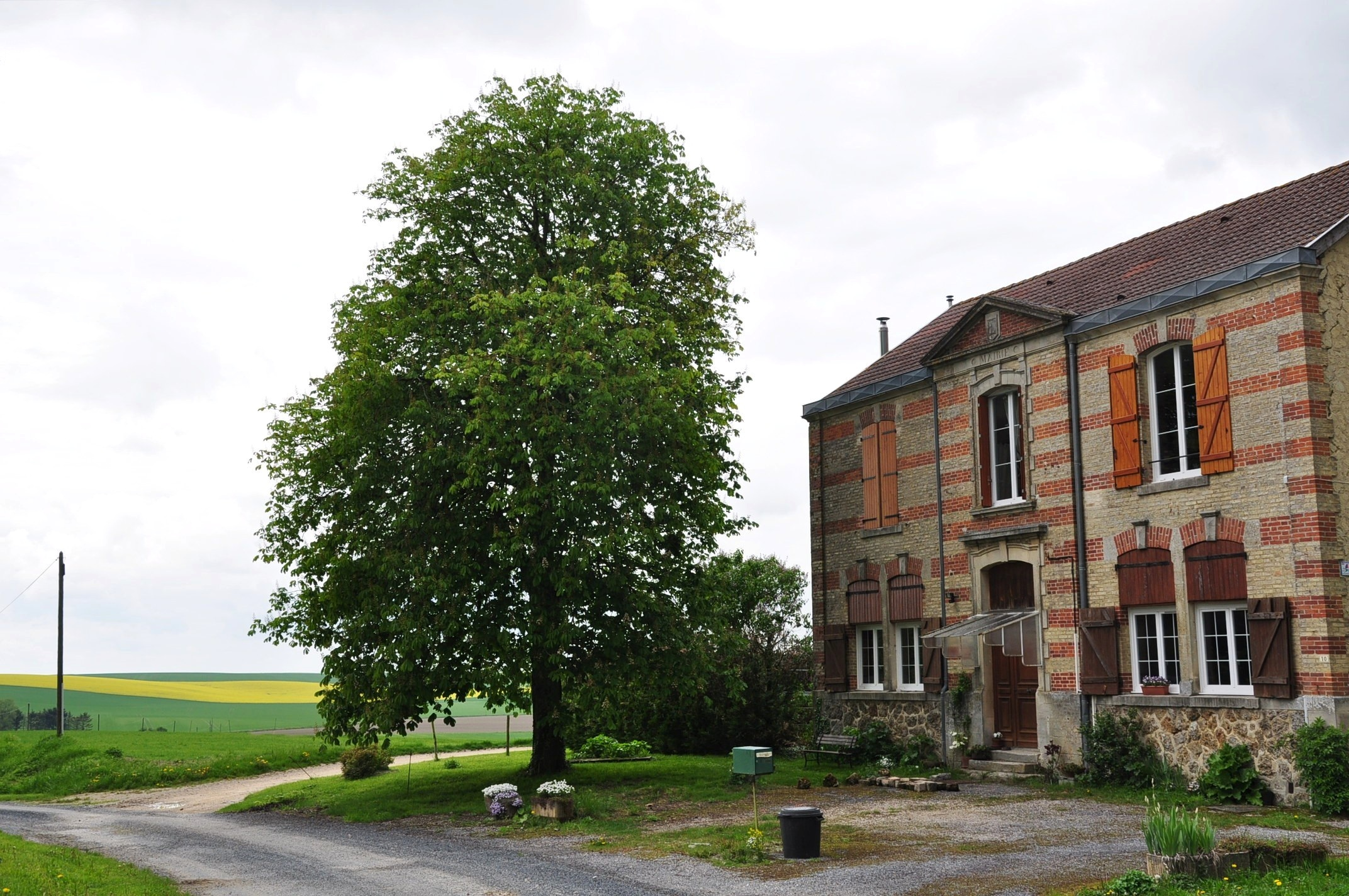
Former town hall of Élise

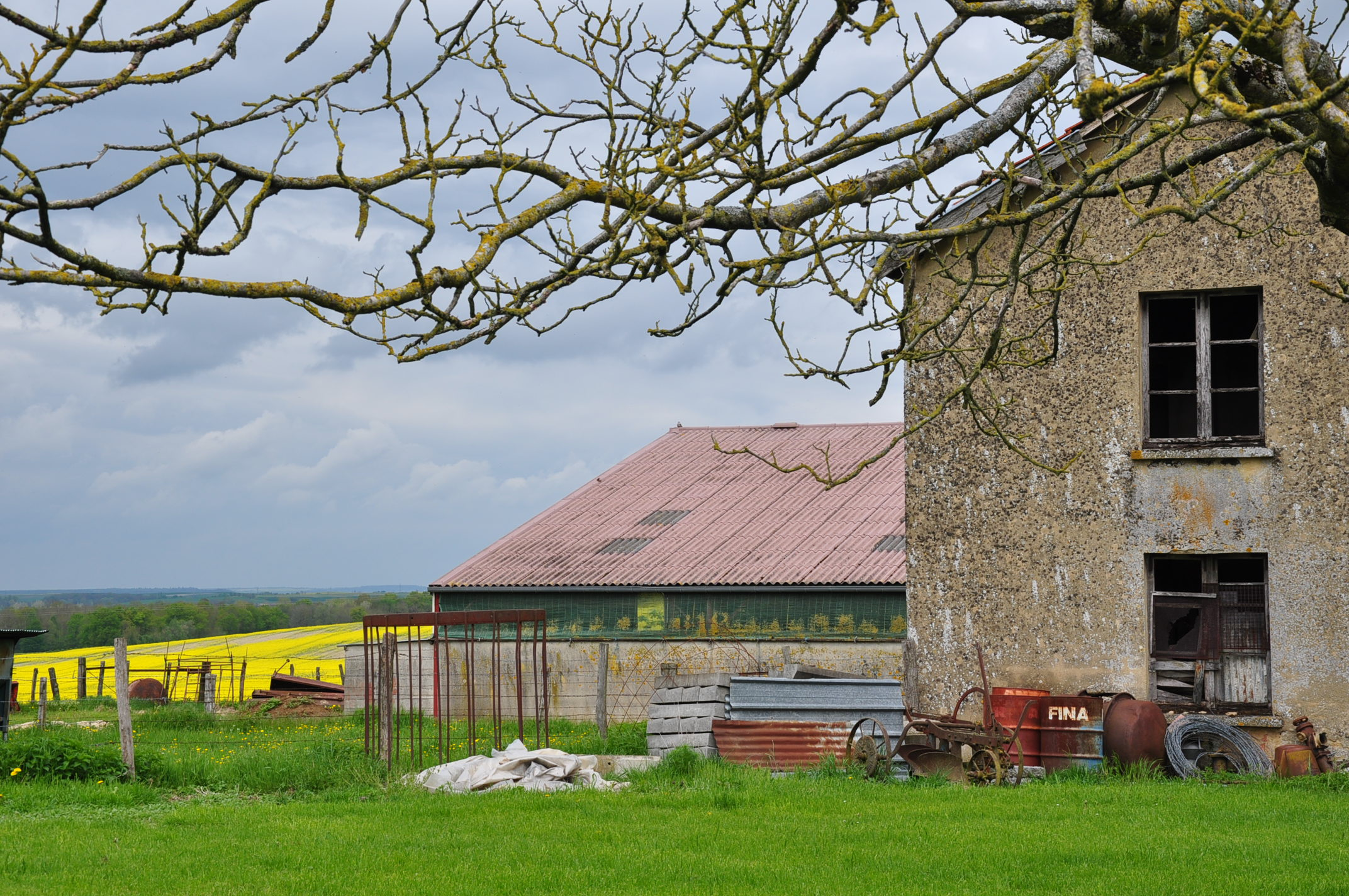
Rural corner in Élise
