= La Chapelle-Felcourt =

- Commune
- Location of La Chapelle-Felcourt
- Location within France Location within Grand Est
- Coordinates: 49°02′45″N 4°45′22″E
- Country: France
- Region: Grand Est
- Department: Marne
- Arrondissement: Châlons-en-Champagne
- Canton: Argonne Suippe et Vesle
- Intercommunality: Argonne Champenoise

Government
  - Mayor (2020–2026): Agnès Blanchet
- Area^{1}: 9.58 km^{2} (3.70 sq mi)
- Elevation: 291 m (955 ft)
- Population (2023): 44
  - Density: 4.6/km^{2} (12/sq mi)
- Time zone: UTC+01:00 (CET)
  - Summer (DST): UTC+02:00 (CEST)
- INSEE/Postal code: 51126 /51800
- ^{1} French Land Register data, which excludes lakes, ponds, glaciers > 1 km^{2} (0.386 sq mi or 247 acres) and river estuaries.

La Chapelle-Felcourt (French pronunciation: [la ʃapɛl fɛlkuʁ]) is a commune in the Marne department in north-eastern France.

== See also ==
- Communes of the Marne department
