= Argers =

- Commune
- Location of Argers
- Location within France Location within Grand Est
- Coordinates: 49°04′09″N 4°51′21″E
- Country: France
- Region: Grand Est
- Department: Marne
- Arrondissement: Châlons-en-Champagne
- Canton: Argonne Suippe et Vesle
- Intercommunality: CC Argonne Champenoise

Government
  - Mayor (2020–2026): Gilles Schelfhout
- Area^{1}: 6.97 km^{2} (2.69 sq mi)
- Elevation: 140 m (460 ft)
- Population (2023): 110
  - Density: 16/km^{2} (41/sq mi)
- Time zone: UTC+01:00 (CET)
  - Summer (DST): UTC+02:00 (CEST)
- INSEE/Postal code: 51015 /51800
- ^{1} French Land Register data, which excludes lakes, ponds, glaciers > 1 km^{2} (0.386 sq mi or 247 acres) and river estuaries.

Argers (French pronunciation: [aʁʒe]) is a commune in the Marne department in northeastern France.

== Climate ==
On average, Argers experiences 63.9 days per year with a minimum temperature below 0 °C (32.0 °F), 1.9 days per year with a minimum temperature below −10 °C (14.0 °F), 5.9 days per year with a maximum temperature below 0 °C (32.0 °F), and 13.9 days per year with a maximum temperature above 30 °C (86.0 °F). The record high temperature was 41.1 °C (106.0 °F) on July 25, 2019, while the record low temperature was −17.5 °C (0.5 °F) on December 20, 2009.

Climate data for Argers (1991–2020 normals, extremes 2003–present)
Month	Jan	Feb	Mar	Apr	May	Jun	Jul	Aug	Sep	Oct	Nov	Dec	Year
Record high °C (°F)	15.5 (59.9)	21.1 (70.0)	24.9 (76.8)	29.2 (84.6)	32.8 (91.0)	36.2 (97.2)	41.1 (106.0)	40.0 (104.0)	34.2 (93.6)	27.4 (81.3)	21.8 (71.2)	16.1 (61.0)	41.1 (106.0)
Mean daily maximum °C (°F)	5.8 (42.4)	7.1 (44.8)	11.4 (52.5)	16.3 (61.3)	19.4 (66.9)	23.3 (73.9)	26.0 (78.8)	25.1 (77.2)	21.4 (70.5)	15.8 (60.4)	10.0 (50.0)	6.4 (43.5)	15.7 (60.2)
Daily mean °C (°F)	3.1 (37.6)	3.7 (38.7)	6.5 (43.7)	10.1 (50.2)	13.4 (56.1)	17.0 (62.6)	19.4 (66.9)	19.0 (66.2)	15.6 (60.1)	11.7 (53.1)	7.1 (44.8)	3.7 (38.7)	10.9 (51.6)
Mean daily minimum °C (°F)	0.4 (32.7)	0.2 (32.4)	1.6 (34.9)	3.9 (39.0)	7.3 (45.1)	10.7 (51.3)	12.7 (54.9)	12.9 (55.2)	9.8 (49.6)	7.6 (45.7)	4.1 (39.4)	1.0 (33.8)	6.0 (42.8)
Record low °C (°F)	−14.6 (5.7)	−14.6 (5.7)	−13.1 (8.4)	−5.3 (22.5)	−1.6 (29.1)	1.1 (34.0)	3.0 (37.4)	4.4 (39.9)	0.0 (32.0)	−6.0 (21.2)	−7.2 (19.0)	−17.5 (0.5)	−17.5 (0.5)
Average precipitation mm (inches)	69.0 (2.72)	59.8 (2.35)	54.0 (2.13)	41.2 (1.62)	71.5 (2.81)	61.7 (2.43)	57.3 (2.26)	69.3 (2.73)	49.0 (1.93)	64.8 (2.55)	61.5 (2.42)	80.3 (3.16)	739.4 (29.11)
Average precipitation days (≥ 1.0 mm)	13.5	11.5	10.7	8.2	11.8	9.3	8.7	8.9	7.1	10.1	11.9	13.3	125.0
Source: Meteociel

== Population ==
Historical population
Year	Pop.	±% p.a.
1968	80	—
1975	75	−0.92%
1982	86	+1.97%
1990	85	−0.15%
1999	73	−1.68%
2007	103	+4.40%
2012	116	+2.41%
2017	117	+0.17%
2023	110	−1.02%
Source: INSEE

== See also ==
- Communes of the Marne department
