= Somme-Yèvre =

- Commune
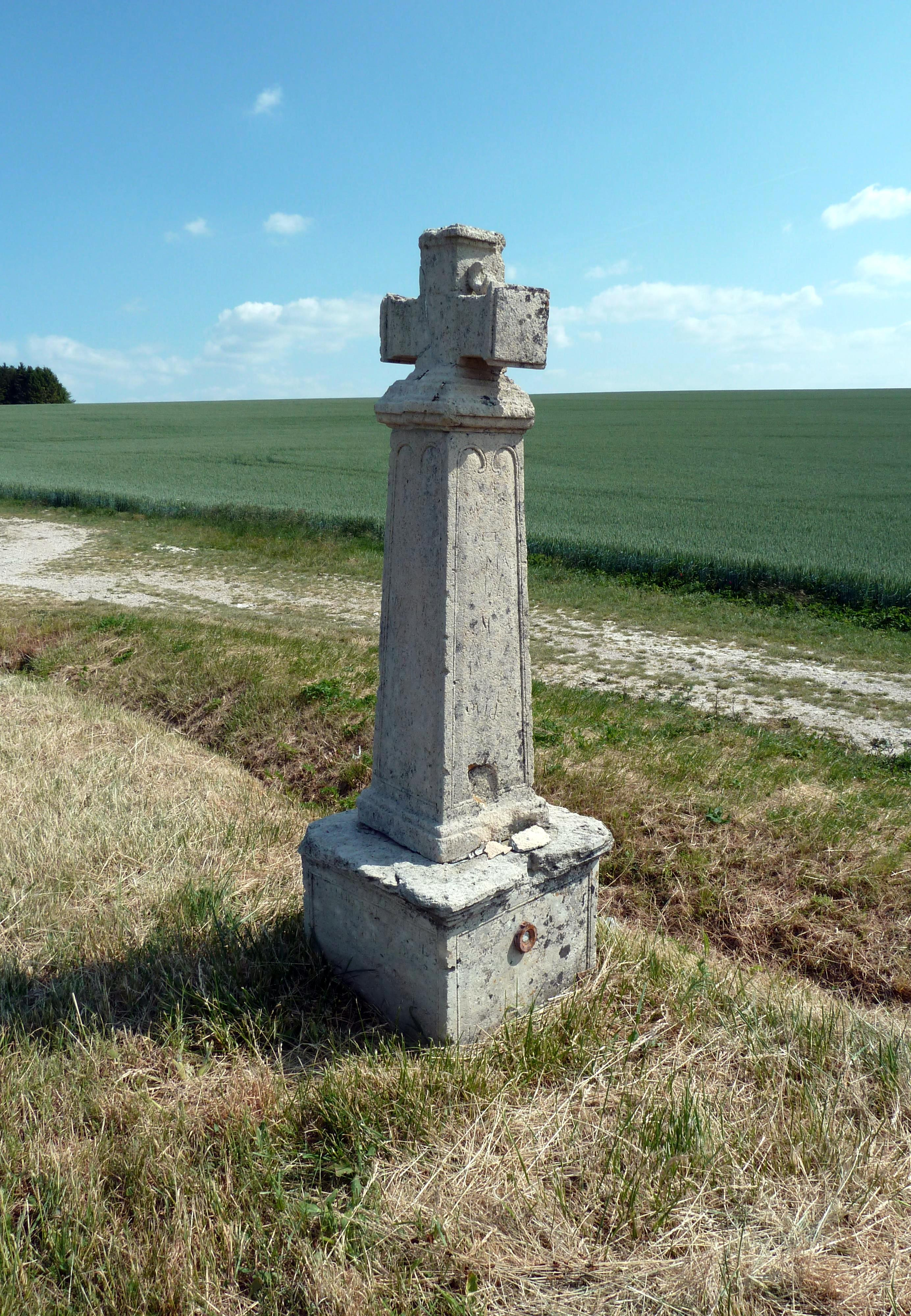
- The Rossin Cross in Somme-Yèvre
- Location of Somme-Yèvre
- Location within France Location within Grand Est
- Coordinates: 48°57′06″N 4°45′38″E
- Country: France
- Region: Grand Est
- Department: Marne
- Arrondissement: Châlons-en-Champagne
- Canton: Argonne Suippe et Vesle

Government
  - Mayor (2020–2026): Paulo Crespo
- Area^{1}: 21.57 km^{2} (8.33 sq mi)
- Elevation: 179 m (587 ft)
- Population (2023): 106
  - Density: 4.91/km^{2} (12.7/sq mi)
- Time zone: UTC+01:00 (CET)
  - Summer (DST): UTC+02:00 (CEST)
- INSEE/Postal code: 51549 /51330
- ^{1} French Land Register data, which excludes lakes, ponds, glaciers > 1 km^{2} (0.386 sq mi or 247 acres) and river estuaries.

Somme-Yèvre (French pronunciation: [sɔm jɛvʁ]) is a commune in the Marne department in north-eastern France.

== See also ==
- Communes of the Marne department
