= Chaudefontaine, Marne =

Chaudefontaine
- Commune
- Location of Chaudefontaine
- Location within France Location within Grand Est
- Coordinates: 49°05′59″N 4°52′13″E
- Country: France
- Region: Grand Est
- Department: Marne
- Arrondissement: Châlons-en-Champagne
- Canton: Argonne Suippe et Vesle
- Intercommunality: Argonne Champenoise

Government
  - Mayor (2020–2026): Patrick Cappy
- Area^{1}: 12.98 km^{2} (5.01 sq mi)
- Elevation: 136 m (446 ft)
- Population (2023): 312
  - Density: 24.0/km^{2} (62.3/sq mi)
- Time zone: UTC+01:00 (CET)
  - Summer (DST): UTC+02:00 (CEST)
- INSEE/Postal code: 51139 /51800
- ^{1} French Land Register data, which excludes lakes, ponds, glaciers > 1 km^{2} (0.386 sq mi or 247 acres) and river estuaries.

Chaudefontaine (French pronunciation: [ʃodfɔ̃tɛn]) is a commune in the Marne department in north-eastern France.

== See also ==
- Communes of the Marne department
