= Rapsécourt =

- Commune
- Location of Rapsécourt
- Location within France Location within Grand Est
- Coordinates: 49°01′28″N 4°47′44″E
- Country: France
- Region: Grand Est
- Department: Marne
- Arrondissement: Châlons-en-Champagne
- Canton: Argonne Suippe et Vesle
- Intercommunality: Argonne Champenoise

Government
  - Mayor (2020–2026): Benoît Machinet
- Area^{1}: 7.23 km^{2} (2.79 sq mi)
- Elevation: 150 m (490 ft)
- Population (2023): 34
  - Density: 4.7/km^{2} (12/sq mi)
- Time zone: UTC+01:00 (CET)
  - Summer (DST): UTC+02:00 (CEST)
- INSEE/Postal code: 51452 /51330
- ^{1} French Land Register data, which excludes lakes, ponds, glaciers > 1 km^{2} (0.386 sq mi or 247 acres) and river estuaries.

Rapsécourt (French pronunciation: [ʁapsekuʁ]) is a commune in the department of Marne in the Grand Est Region of north-eastern France.

== See also ==
- Communes of the Marne department
