= Dommartin-Varimont =

- Commune
- Location of Dommartin-Varimont
- Location within France Location within Grand Est
- Coordinates: 48°58′44″N 4°46′59″E
- Country: France
- Region: Grand Est
- Department: Marne
- Arrondissement: Châlons-en-Champagne
- Canton: Argonne Suippe et Vesle
- Intercommunality: Argonne Champenoise

Government
  - Mayor (2020–2026): Benoît Roth
- Area^{1}: 23.6 km^{2} (9.1 sq mi)
- Elevation: 158 m (518 ft)
- Population (2023): 136
  - Density: 5.76/km^{2} (14.9/sq mi)
- Time zone: UTC+01:00 (CET)
  - Summer (DST): UTC+02:00 (CEST)
- INSEE/Postal code: 51214 /51330
- ^{1} French Land Register data, which excludes lakes, ponds, glaciers > 1 km^{2} (0.386 sq mi or 247 acres) and river estuaries.

Dommartin-Varimont (French pronunciation: [dɔmaʁtɛ̃ vaʁimɔ̃]) is a commune in the Marne department in north-eastern France.

== Demography ==
Historical population
Year	Pop.	±% p.a.
1968	165	—
1975	148	−1.54%
1982	133	−1.52%
1990	119	−1.38%
1999	125	+0.55%
2007	132	+0.68%
2012	139	+1.04%
2017	138	−0.14%
2023	136	−0.24%
Source: INSEE

== See also ==
- Communes of the Marne department
