= Voilemont =

- Commune
- Location of Voilemont
- Location within France Location within Grand Est
- Coordinates: 49°02′55″N 4°47′56″E
- Country: France
- Region: Grand Est
- Department: Marne
- Arrondissement: Châlons-en-Champagne
- Canton: Argonne Suippe et Vesle
- Intercommunality: Argonne Champenoise

Government
  - Mayor (2020–2026): Jean-Claude Nassoy
- Area^{1}: 5.81 km^{2} (2.24 sq mi)
- Elevation: 139 m (456 ft)
- Population (2023): 47
  - Density: 8.1/km^{2} (21/sq mi)
- Time zone: UTC+01:00 (CET)
  - Summer (DST): UTC+02:00 (CEST)
- INSEE/Postal code: 51650 /51800
- ^{1} French Land Register data, which excludes lakes, ponds, glaciers > 1 km^{2} (0.386 sq mi or 247 acres) and river estuaries.

Voilemont (French pronunciation: [vwalmɔ̃]) is a commune in the Marne department in north-eastern France.

== See also ==
- Communes of the Marne department
