= Dommartin-Dampierre =

- Commune
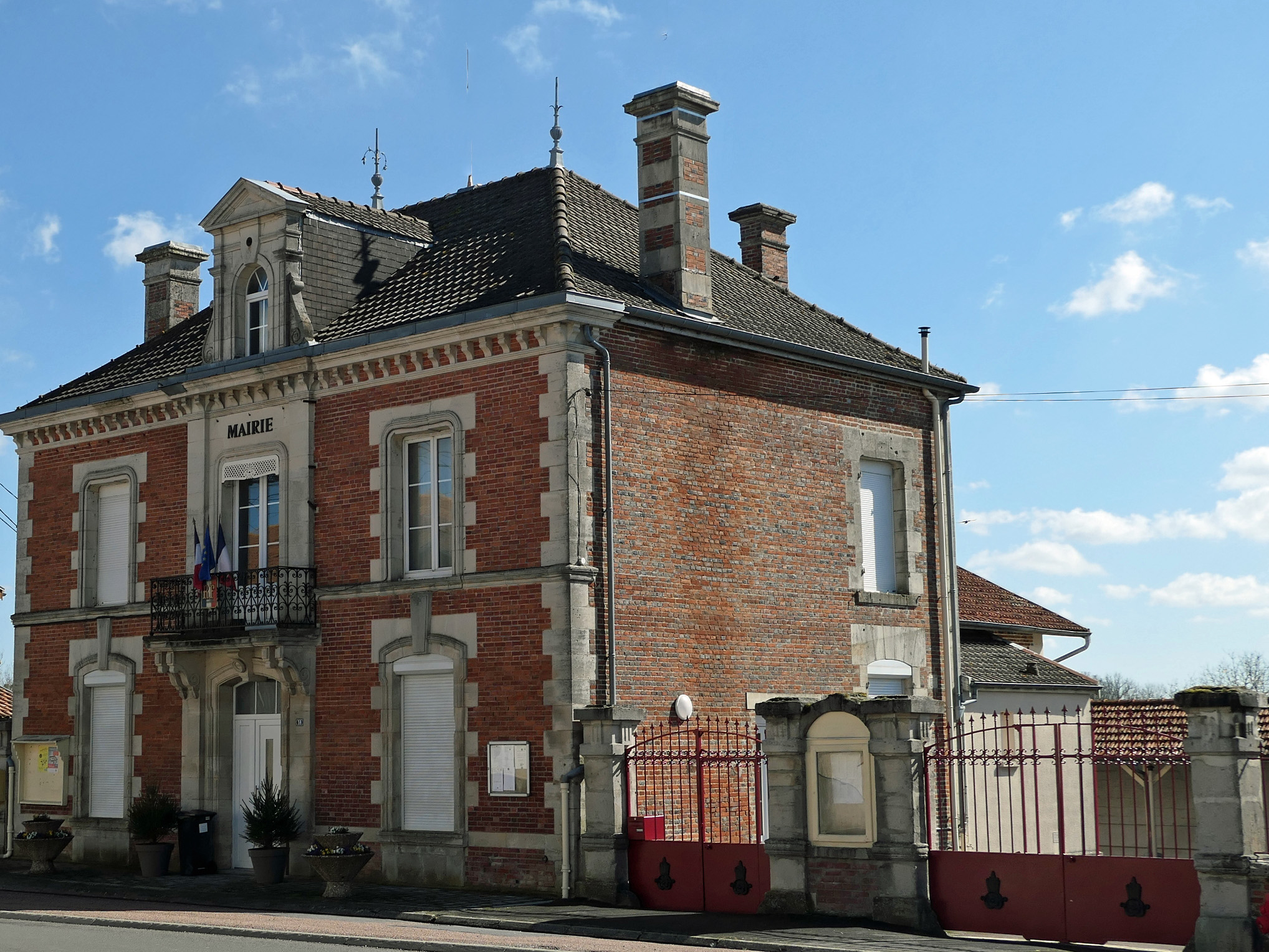
- Town hall
- Location of Dommartin-Dampierre
- Location within France Location within Grand Est
- Coordinates: 49°04′24″N 4°49′39″E
- Country: France
- Region: Grand Est
- Department: Marne
- Arrondissement: Châlons-en-Champagne
- Canton: Argonne Suippe et Vesle
- Intercommunality: Argonne Champenoise

Government
  - Mayor (2020–2026): Michel Bontemps
- Area^{1}: 8.27 km^{2} (3.19 sq mi)
- Elevation: 153 m (502 ft)
- Population (2023): 76
  - Density: 9.2/km^{2} (24/sq mi)
- Time zone: UTC+01:00 (CET)
  - Summer (DST): UTC+02:00 (CEST)
- INSEE/Postal code: 51211 /51800
- ^{1} French Land Register data, which excludes lakes, ponds, glaciers > 1 km^{2} (0.386 sq mi or 247 acres) and river estuaries.

Dommartin-Dampierre (French pronunciation: [dɔmaʁtɛ̃ dɑ̃pjɛʁ]) is a commune in the Marne department in north-eastern France.

== Demography ==
Historical population
Year	Pop.	±% p.a.
1968	83	—
1975	78	−0.88%
1982	83	+0.89%
1990	95	+1.70%
1999	70	−3.34%
2007	72	+0.35%
2012	70	−0.56%
2017	69	−0.29%
2023	76	+1.62%
Source: INSEE

== See also ==
- Communes of the Marne department
