= The Amazing Race 16 =

Season of television series

- Season 16
- Region 1 DVD cover
- Presented by: Phil Keoghan
- No. of teams: 11
- Winners: Dan & Jordan Pious
- No. of legs: 12
- Distance traveled: 40,000 mi (64,000 km)
- No. of episodes: 12

Release
- Original network: CBS
- Original release: February 14 – May 9, 2010

Additional information
- Filming dates: November 28 – December 20, 2009

Series chronology
- ← Previous; Season 15 Next → Season 17

The Amazing Race 16 is the sixteenth season of the American reality competition show The Amazing Race. Hosted by Phil Keoghan, it featured eleven teams of two, each with a pre-existing relationship, competing in a race around the world to win US$1,000,000. This season visited five continents and nine countries and traveled over 40,000 miles (64,000 km) during twelve legs. Starting in Los Angeles, racers traveled through Chile, Argentina, Germany, France, the Seychelles, Malaysia, Singapore, and China before returning to the United States and finishing in San Francisco. This season also saw the return of the Intersection. The season premiered on CBS on February 14, 2010, and concluded on May 9, 2010. In Canada, the show premiered on the A-Channel instead of CTV due to the 2010 Winter Olympics, but it returned to CTV after the Winter Olympics concluded.

Brothers Dan and Jordan Pious were the winners of this season, while cowboy brothers Jet and Cord McCoy finished in second place, and dating models Brent Horne and Caite Upton finished in third place.

== Production ==
=== Development and filming ===
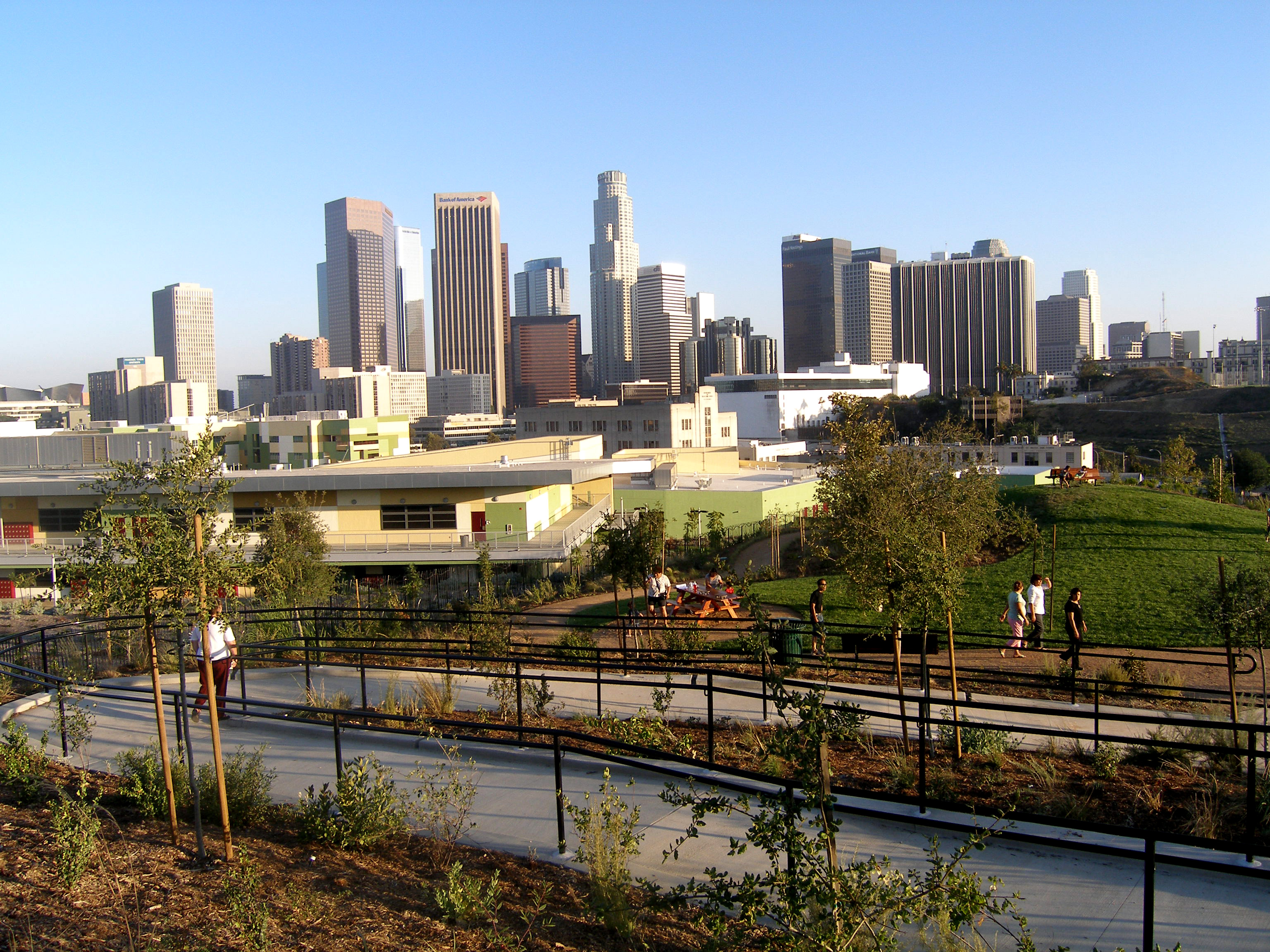
Teams started off the 16th season of The Amazing Race at Vista Hermosa Natural Park in Los Angeles.

The sixteenth season spanned 40,000 miles (64,000 km) across five continents and nine countries, including a first-time visit to the Seychelles.

Racers were observed leaving Los Angeles International Airport on November 28, 2009. Racers checked into a Pit Stop in Puerto Varas, Chile, on December 2. Filming of the show also was reported in Bariloche, Argentina. Production crews were reported in Singapore, particularly in the Bugis area and the Singapore Flyer, on December 16.

In the episode which aired on February 28, 2010, and featured the contestants departing Chile, Phil Keoghan acknowledged the February 27 Chilean earthquake in a special opening.

Leg 4 featured an Intersection for the first time since season 11. Additionally, teams did a Roadblock together for the first time, where one person from each of the Intersected teams worked together to complete the Roadblock.

=== Casting ===
Applications were originally due on July 10, 2009, but the deadline was extended. Semi-finalist interviews were held in August 2009 and the final casting interviews took place in Los Angeles in September and October 2009. Filming took place in November and December 2009.

=== Marketing ===
7 Up served as an episode sponsor for the seventh leg.

== Contestants ==
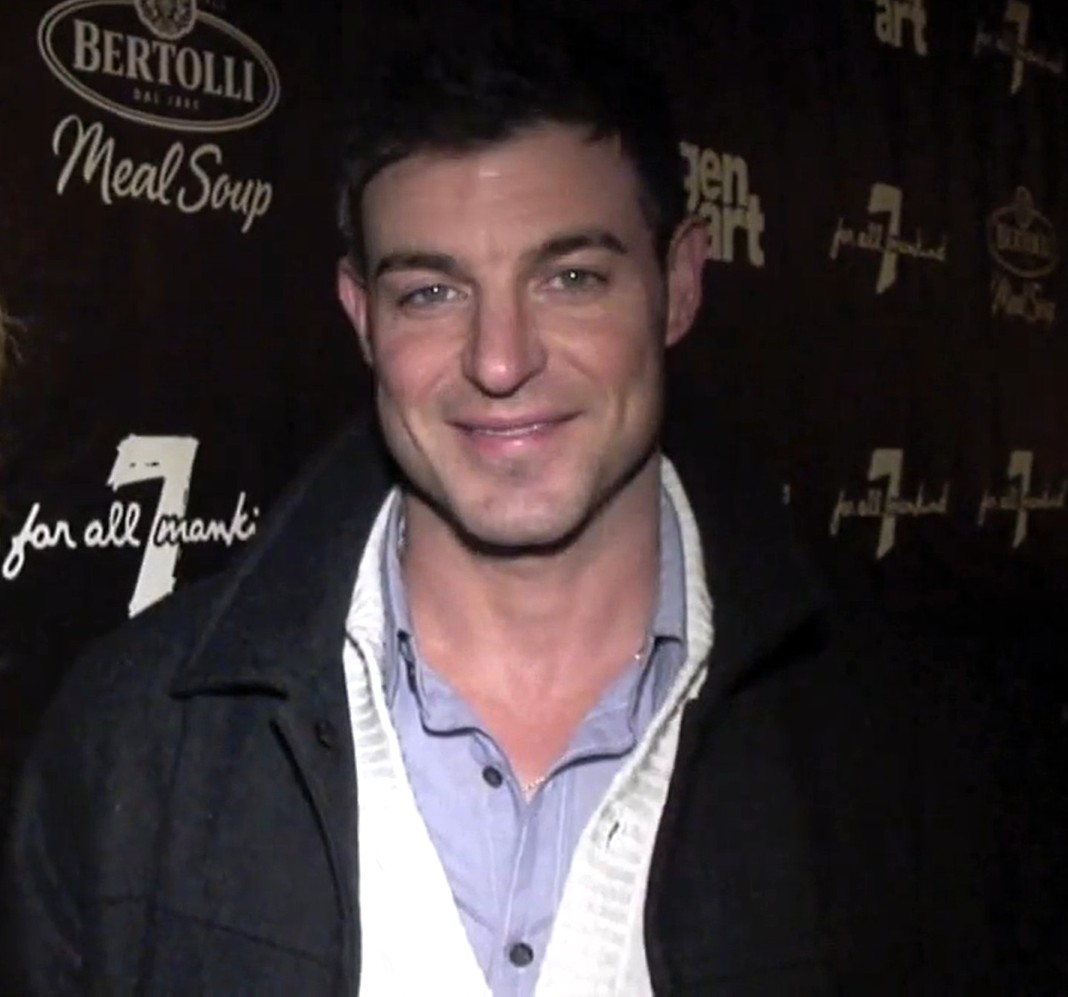
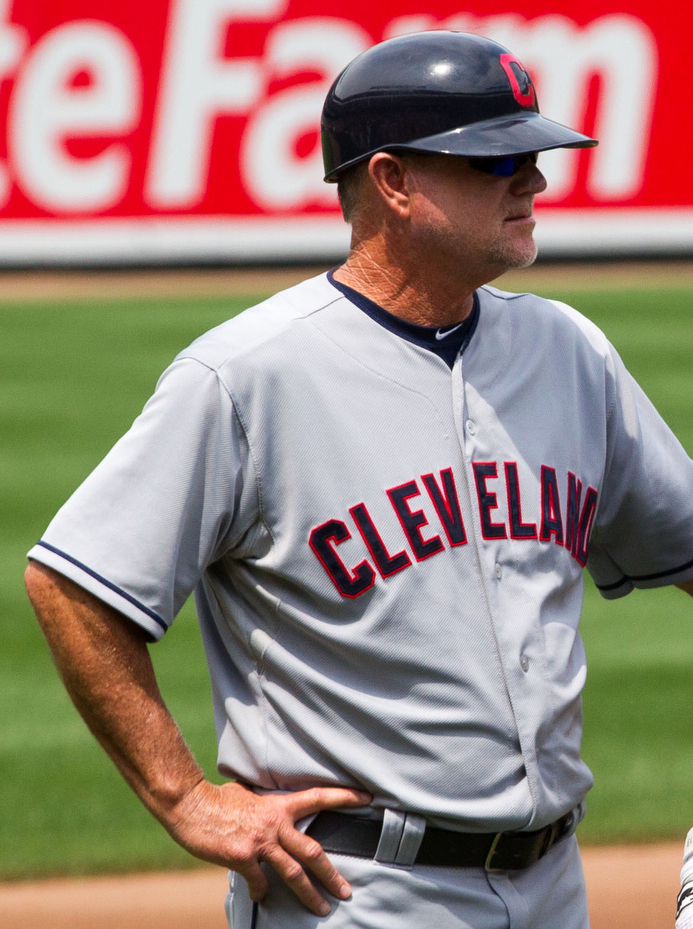
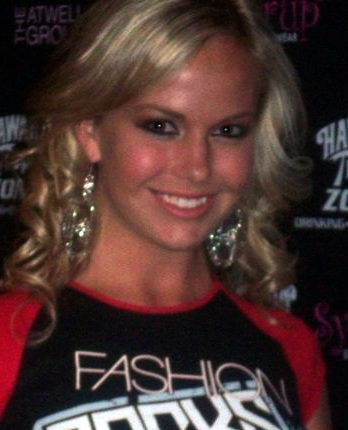
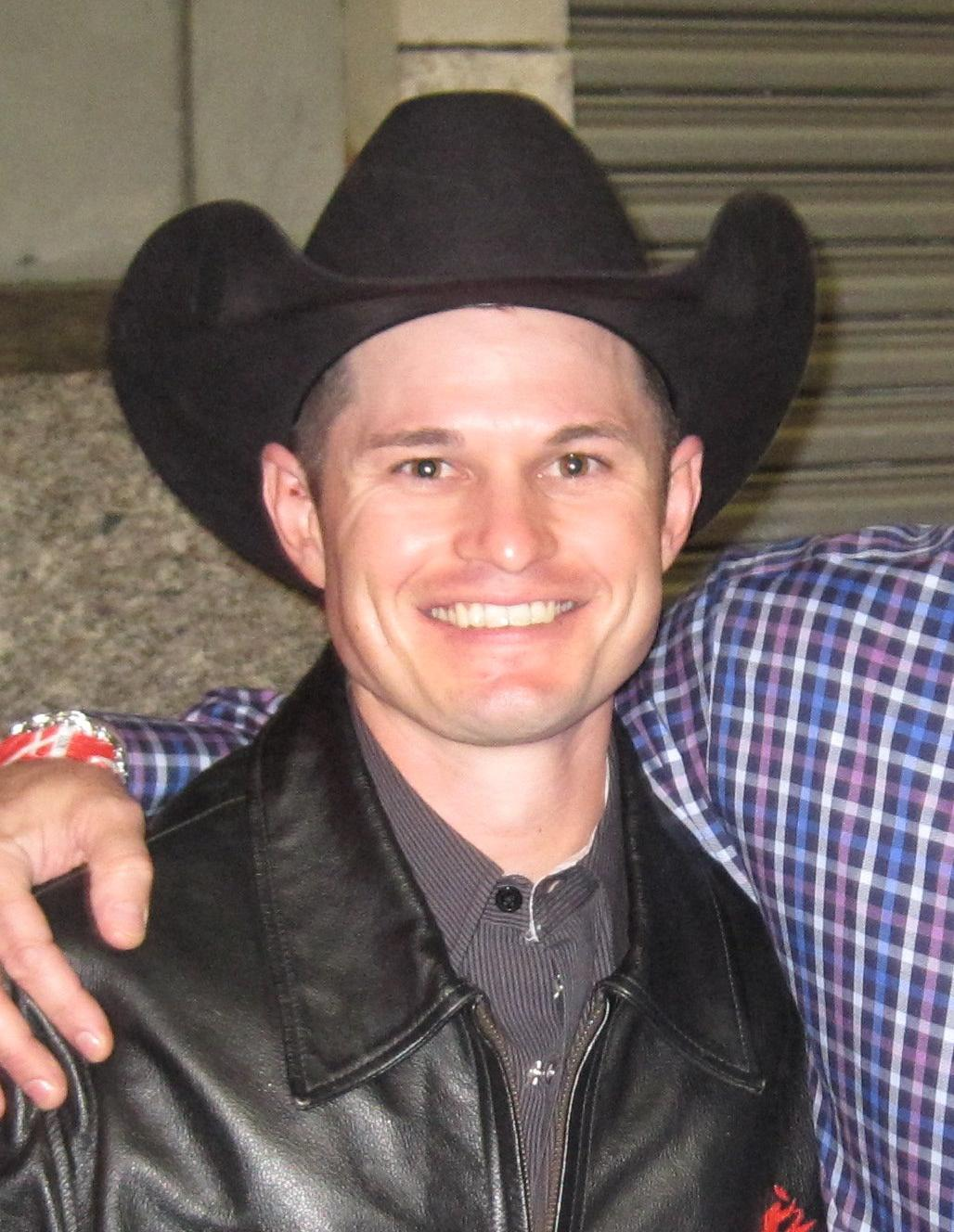
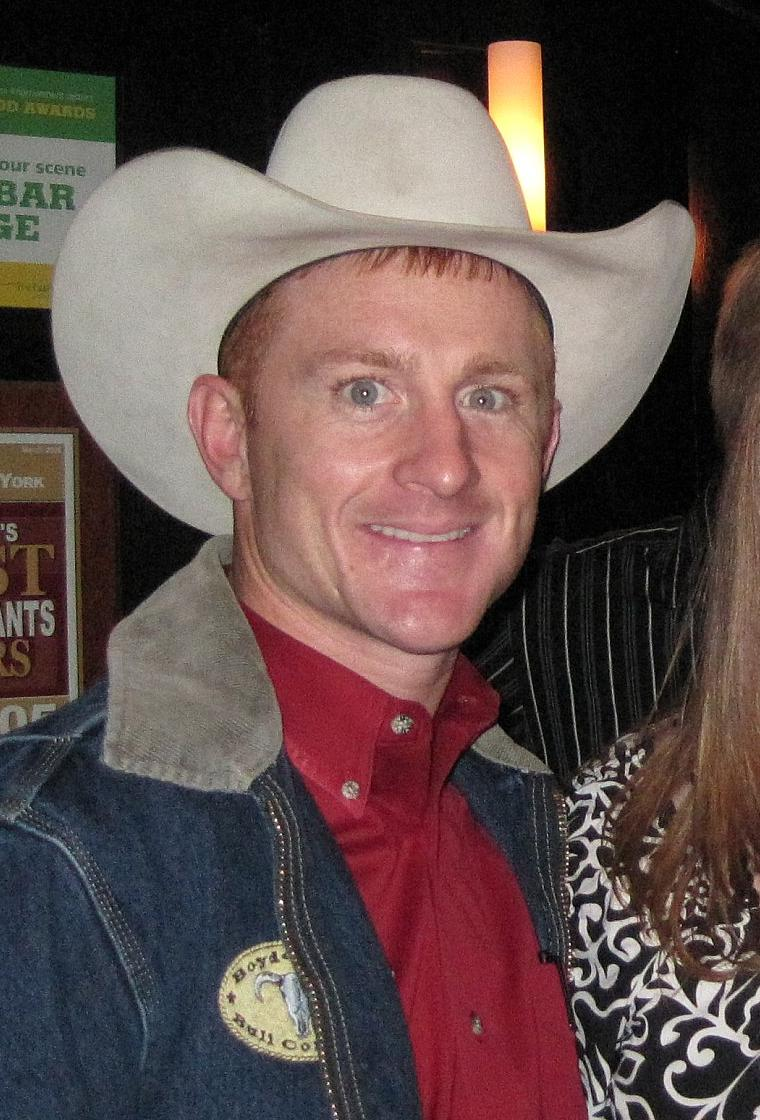
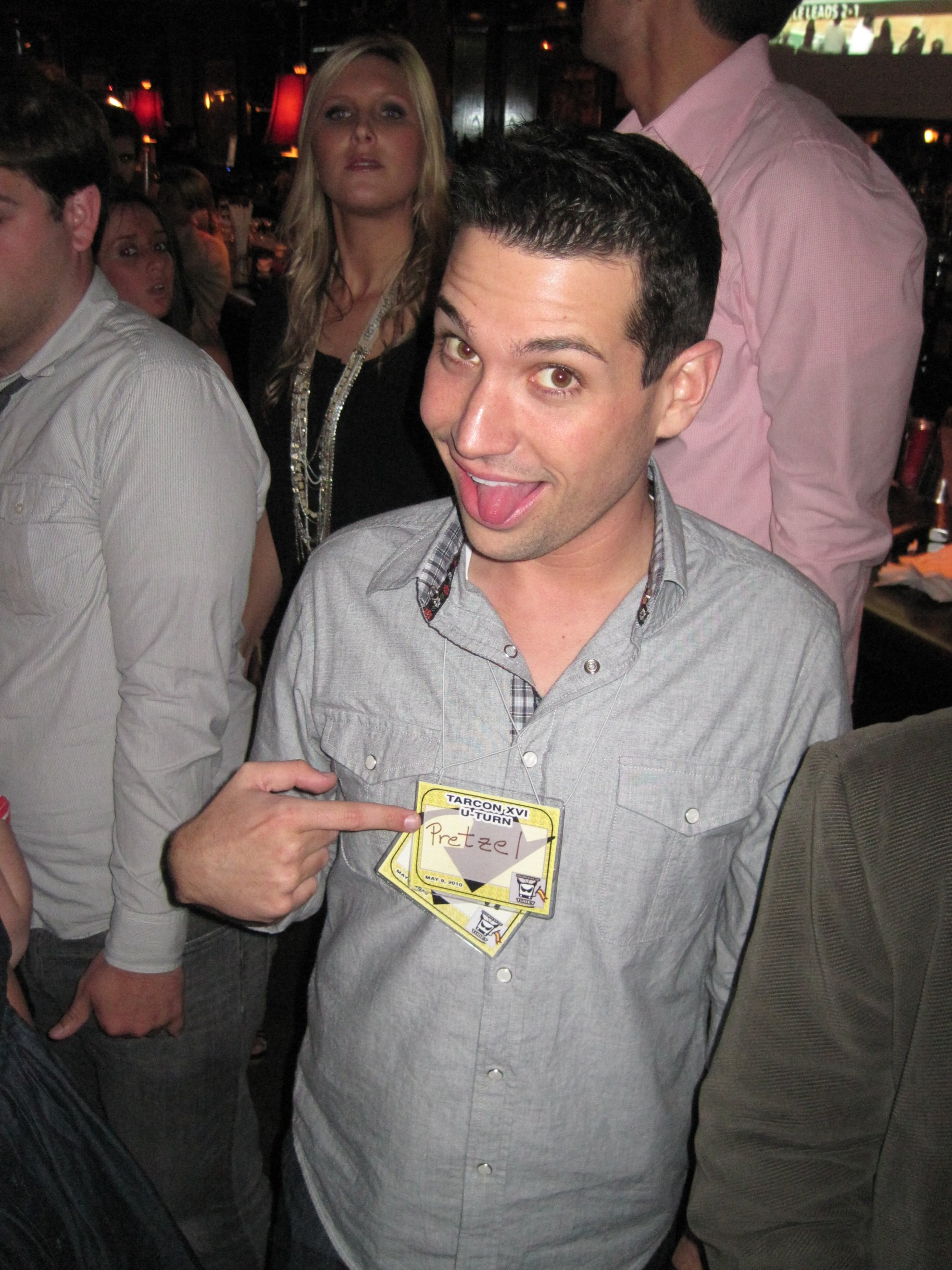
From left to right: Jeff Schroeder, Steve Smith, Caite Upton, Jet McCoy, Cord McCoy, and Jordan Pious

Notable cast members included Big Brother 11 HouseGuests Jordan Lloyd and Jeff Schroeder, professional bull rider Cord McCoy, and Cleveland Indians third-base coach Steve Smith. Caite Upton was the 2007 Miss South Carolina Teen USA, who gained international notoriety after giving a convoluted response to a question asked to her during the Miss Teen USA 2007 pageant.

Contestants	Age	Relationship	Hometown	Status
Dana Davis	39	High School Sweethearts	Arlington, Texas	Eliminated 1st (in Valparaíso, Chile)
Adrian Davis	40	High School Sweethearts	Arlington, Texas	Eliminated 1st (in Valparaíso, Chile)
Jody Kelly	71	Grandmother & Granddaughter	Round Rock, Texas	Eliminated 2nd (in Puerto Varas, Chile)
Shannon Foster	22	Grandmother & Granddaughter	Georgetown, Texas	Eliminated 2nd (in Puerto Varas, Chile)
Monique Pryor	39	Moms & Attorneys	West Orange, New Jersey	Eliminated 3rd (in San Carlos de Bariloche, Argentina)
Shawne Morgan	39	Moms & Attorneys	Bowie, Maryland	Eliminated 3rd (in San Carlos de Bariloche, Argentina)
Joe Wang	42	Married	El Segundo, California	Eliminated 4th (in Massiges, France)
Heidi Wang	37	Married	El Segundo, California	Eliminated 4th (in Massiges, France)
Jordan Lloyd	22	Newly Dating	Charlotte, North Carolina	Eliminated 5th (in Épernay, France)
Jeff Schroeder	31	Newly Dating	Norridge, Illinois	Eliminated 5th (in Épernay, France)
Steve Smith	57	Father & Daughter	Encinitas, California	Eliminated 6th (in George Town, Malaysia)
Allie Smith	23	Father & Daughter	Encinitas, California	Eliminated 6th (in George Town, Malaysia)
Carol Rosenfeld	47	Dating	Los Angeles, California	Eliminated 7th (in Singapore)
Brandy Snow	40	Dating	Los Angeles, California	Eliminated 7th (in Singapore)
Louie Stravato	47	Detectives	Providence, Rhode Island	Eliminated 8th (in Shanghai, China)
Michael Naylor	45	Detectives	Providence, Rhode Island	Eliminated 8th (in Shanghai, China)
Brent Horne	28	Dating Models	Columbia, South Carolina	Third place
Caite Upton	20	Dating Models	Lexington, South Carolina	Third place
Jet McCoy	30	Brothers & Cowboys	Ada, Oklahoma	Runners-up
Cord McCoy	29	Brothers & Cowboys	Tupelo, Oklahoma	Runners-up
Dan Pious	24	Brothers	Barrington, Rhode Island	Winners
Jordan Pious	22	Brothers	Barrington, Rhode Island	Winners

Future appearances

Jet & Cord raced again in The Amazing Race: Unfinished Business. They raced again in The Amazing Race: All Stars. Jet and Cord also appeared on The Amazing Race: 25 Years Around the World.

Jordan & Jeff competed on Big Brother 13 a year later. The two returned to the Big Brother house three years later on the thirty-third episode of Big Brother 16, where they got engaged. In 2015, they also appeared on Marriage Boot Camp: Reality Stars 3. On May 24, 2016, Jeff Schroeder appeared on a Big Brother-themed primetime special of The Price Is Right. He also appeared on the second episode of Big Brother: Over the Top to host a Power of Veto competition and on the penultimate episode of Big Brother 20.

== Results ==
The following teams are listed with their placements in each leg. Placements are listed in finishing order.

- A red placement with a dagger (†) indicates that the team was eliminated.
- An underlined blue placement with a double-dagger (‡) indicates that the team was the last to arrive at a Pit Stop in a non-elimination leg, and had to perform a Speed Bump task in the following leg.
- A green ƒ indicates that the team won the Fast Forward.
- A brown ⊃ indicates that the team used the U-Turn and a brown ⊂ indicates the team on the receiving end of the U-Turn.
- A violet + indicates that the teams encountered an Intersection.

Team placement (by leg)
Team	1	2	3	4+ (Note: This leg featured an Intersection. The teams were paired up thusly: Dan & Jordan and Carol & Brandy, Jet & Cord and Louie & Michael, Brent & Caite and Jordan & Jeff, and Steve & Allie and Joe & Heidi.)	5	6	7	8	9	10	11	12
Dan & Jordan	8th (Note: Dan & Jordan initially arrived 4th, but were issued a 15-minute penalty for losing a brush during a task. Four teams checked in during this penalty time, dropping Dan & Jordan to 8th.)	8th	6th	6th	4th	5th	2nd	5th	1stƒ (Note: This team won the Fast Forward on this leg.)	3rd	3rd	1st
Jet & Cord	3rd	1st	1st	4th	3rd	4th	6th‡ (Note: Jet & Cord initially arrived 5th, but did not retrieve the clue giving directions to the Pit Stop after completing the Roadblock, and had to go back to retrieve the clue. Carol & Brandy checked in during this time, dropping Jet & Cord to last.)	1st	3rd	1st	2nd	2nd
Brent & Caite	7th (Note: Brent & Caite initially arrived 2nd, but were issued a 30-minute penalty for traveling on foot instead of taking the funicular as instructed in the clue. Five teams checked in during this penalty time, dropping Brent & Caite to 7th.)	4th	7th	7th	6th	6th (Note: Brent & Caite initially arrived 3rd, but did not complete the Detour, having arrived at the Pit Stop accidentally. They had to go back to complete the Detour. Three teams checked in during this time, dropping Brent & Caite to 6th.)	3rd	4th	2nd⊃ (Note: Brent & Caite chose to use the U-Turn on Carol & Brandy.)	2nd	1st	3rd
Louie & Michael	9th	9th	8th	1st	1st⊃ (Note: Louie & Michael chose to use the U-Turn on Joe & Heidi.)	1st	4th	3rd	4th	4th‡	4th†	
Carol & Brandy	6th	3rd	3rd	5th	5th	2nd	5th	2nd	5th†⊂			
Steve & Allie	4th	7th	2nd	2nd	2nd	3rd	1st	6th†				
Jordan & Jeff	1st	6th	5th	8th‡	7th	7th†						
Joe & Heidi	5th	2nd	4th	3rd	8th†⊂							
Monique & Shawne	2nd	5th	9th†									
Jody & Shannon	10th	10th†										
Dana & Adrian	11th†											

== Race summary ==
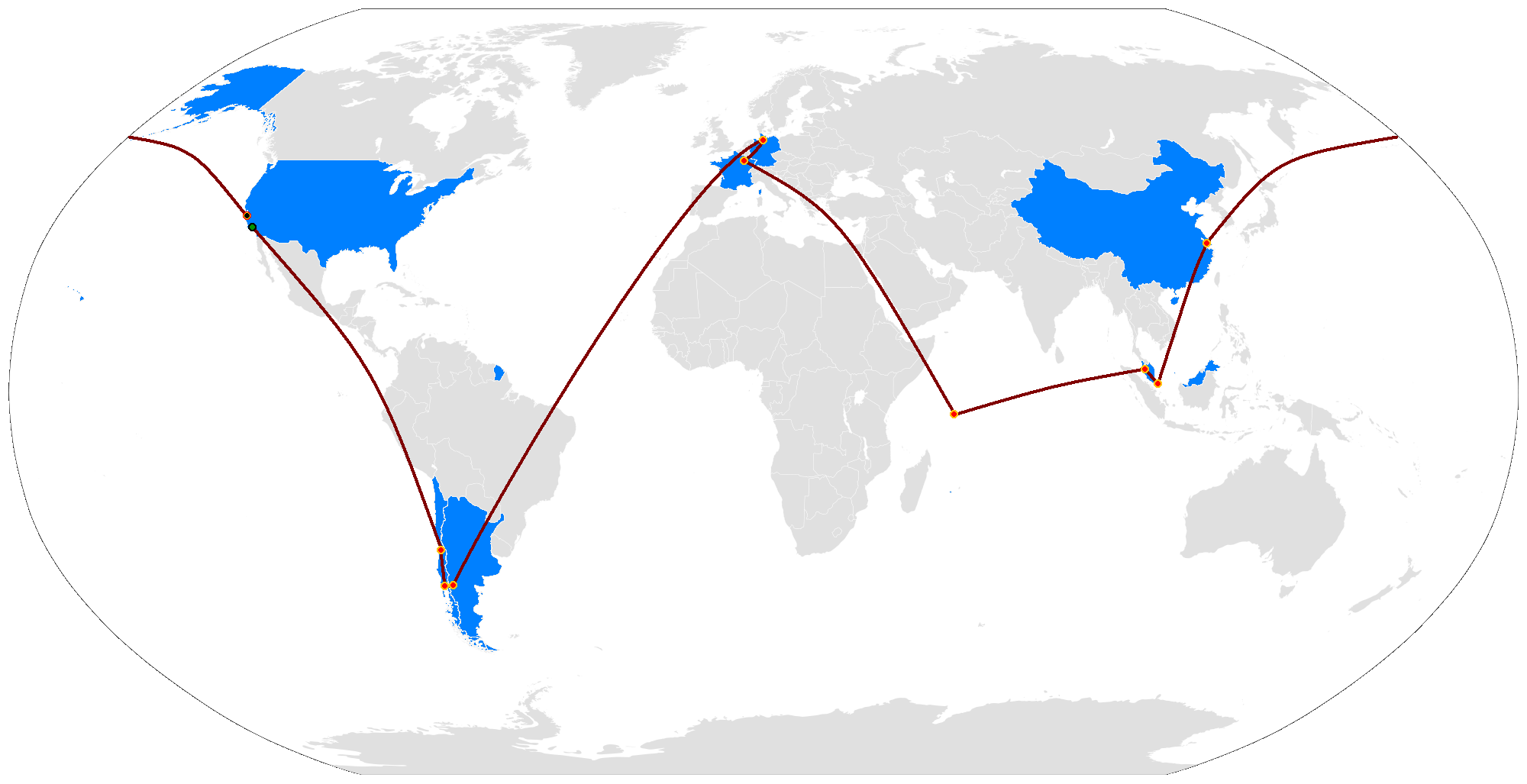
The route of The Amazing Race 16.

Destinations	Air travel Rail travel Water travel Bus travel Helicopter travel Bicycle travel Gondola travel
Route Markers	Detour Roadblock Fast Forward Intersection; U-Turn Speed Bump Pit Stop

=== Leg 1 (United States → Chile) ===
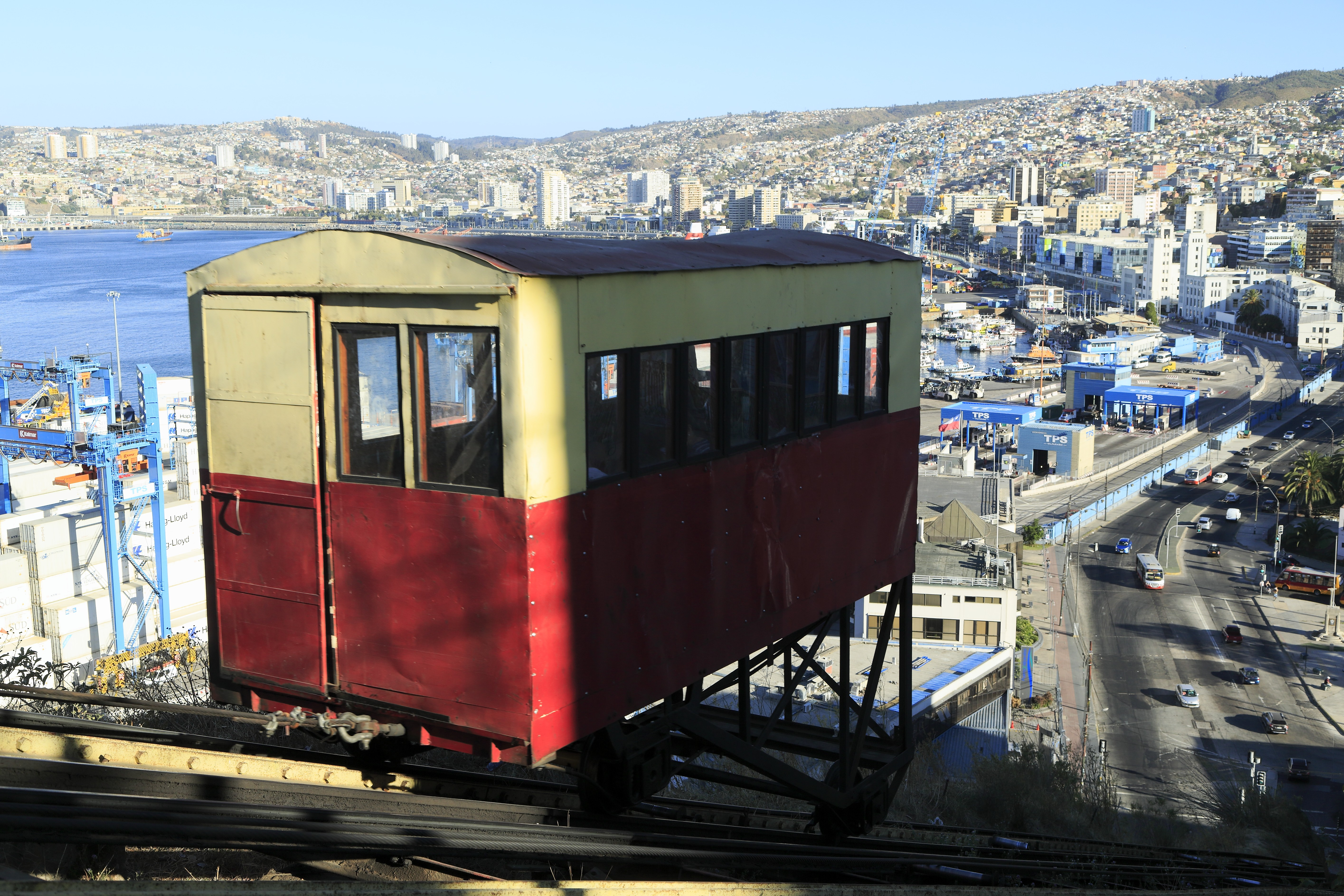
In order to travel throughout the mountainous town of Valparaíso, teams rode the various funicular railways between tasks, including the Ascensor Artillería.

- Episode 1: "Nanna Is Kickin' Your Butt" (February 14, 2010)
- Prize: A trip for two to Vancouver, British Columbia (awarded to Jordan & Jeff)
- Eliminated: Dana & Adrian

Locations

- Los Angeles, California (Vista Hermosa Natural Park) (Starting Line)
- or Los Angeles (Los Angeles International Airport)
- Los Angeles (Los Angeles International Airport) → Santiago, Chile
- Santiago → Valparaíso
- Valparaíso (Ascensor Villaseca (in Spanish))
- Valparaíso (Ascensor Artillería)
- Valparaíso (Paseo Templeman)
- Valparaíso (Palacio Baburizza)

Episode summary

- Teams set off from Vista Hermosa Natural Park in Los Angeles, California, and had to travel by public transportation to Los Angeles International Airport, where they booked one of two American Airlines flights to Santiago, Chile. The first three teams received tickets on a flight that would have departed one hour ahead of the second flight, but due to a mechanical failure on the first flight, those three teams were re-booked on the second flight with the other eight teams. After arriving in Santiago, teams had to travel by bus to Valparaíso.
- In this season's first Roadblock, one team member had to cross a tightrope the length of a football field (360 ft or 110 m) suspended 120 feet (37 m) above the ground to the end of the valley, where they found their next clue.
- After the Roadblock, teams had to take a funicular down the mountain to find their next clue. Teams then had to travel to Paseo Templeman, pick up painting supplies, and find a group of house painters next to a house matching the color of their paint. Once at the house, they had to finish painting a portion of the house in order to receive their next clue directing them to the Pit Stop: Palacio Baburizza.

Additional notes

- Once in Valparaíso, teams had to travel to Wulff Castle in Viña del Mar and find their next clue, which sent them to Ascensor Villaseca. This task was unaired.
- Dana & Adrian were unable to complete the Roadblock. After all the other teams checked in at the Pit Stop, Phil came out to the Roadblock to inform them of their elimination.

=== Leg 2 (Chile) ===
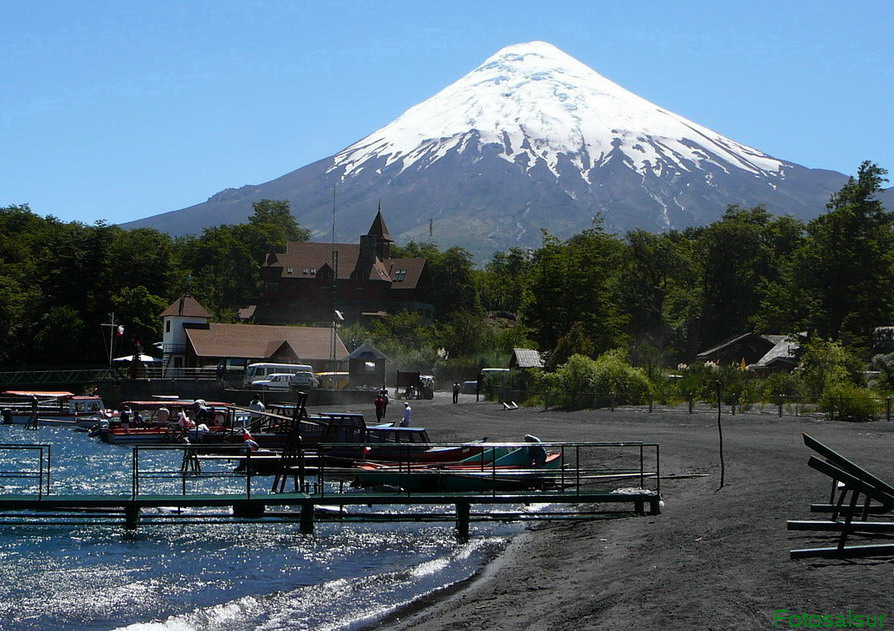
In this leg, teams traveled throughout the Los Lagos Region of Chile, known for its lakes and the Osorno Volcano.

- Episode 2: "When the Cow Kicked Me in the Head" (February 21, 2010)
- Prize: A pair of sailboats (awarded to Jet & Cord)
- Eliminated: Jody & Shannon

Locations

- Valparaíso (Palacio Baburizza)
- Valparaíso → Santiago
- Santiago → Puerto Varas
- Vicente Pérez Rosales National Park (Hotel Petrohué) → Todos los Santos Lake (Isla Margarita – Mirador)
- Puerto Varas (Onces y Cabañas Bellavista)
- Puerto Varas (Iglesia del Sagrado Corazón de Jesús (in Spanish) – Gruta de la Virgen)

Episode summary

- At the start of this leg, teams had to travel by bus back to Santiago before boarding another bus to Puerto Varas. Once there, teams had to drive themselves to the Hotel Petrohué and then take a boat to Isla Margarita on Todos los Santos Lake in order to find their next clue.
- This season's first Detour was a choice between Llama Adoration or Condor Consternation. In Llama Adoration, teams traveled by boat to a farm where they had to properly dress a llama in order to receive their next clue. In Condor Consternation, teams traveled by boat to a beach where they used hang glider-like condor costumes to "fly" to their next clue in the water.
- After the Detour, teams had to drive to the Onces y Cabañas Bellavista in Puerto Varas, where they found their next clue.
- In this leg's Roadblock, teams had to collect the ingredients to make Kuchen – including a plate of butter, a bowl of sugar, a bag of flour, a baker's dozen of eggs from a hen house, and a cup of milk from a cow – and then deliver them to the baker in order to receive a serving of Kuchen and their next clue directing them to the Pit Stop: the Iglesia del Sagrado Corazón de Jesús in Puerto Varas.

=== Leg 3 (Chile → Argentina) ===
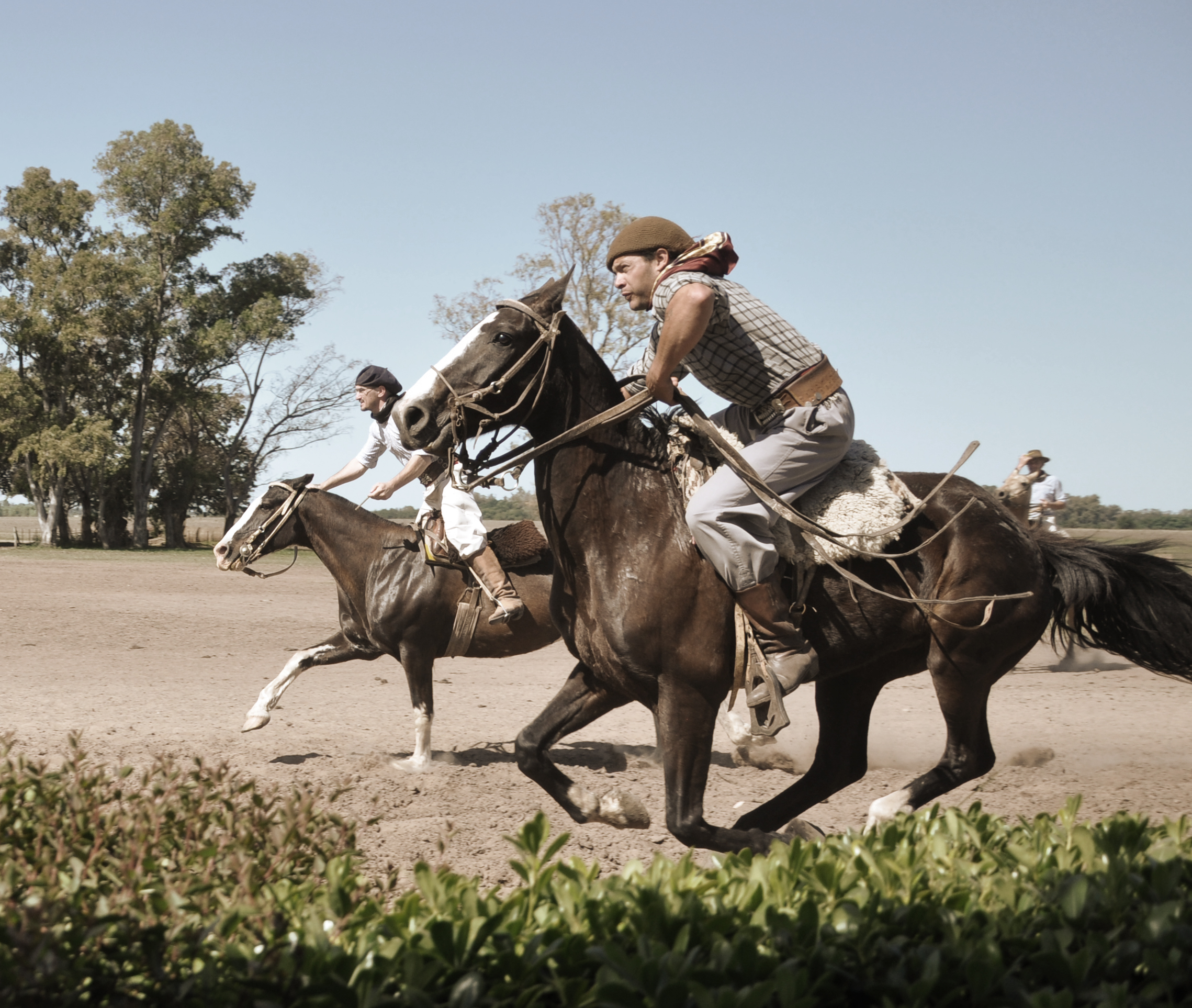
Tasks featured on this leg related to gauchos and other aspects of Argentine equestrianism.

- Episode 3: "Run Like Scalded Dogs!" (February 28, 2010)
- Prize: A trip for two to Patagonia (awarded to Jet & Cord)
- Eliminated: Monique & Shawne

Locations

- Puerto Varas (Iglesia del Sagrado Corazón de Jesús (in Spanish) – Gruta de la Virgen)
- Puerto Varas → San Carlos de Bariloche, Argentina
- Nahuel Huapi (El Boliche Viejo)
- Nahuel Huapi (Peña Gaucha)
- Ñirihuau (Puente Ñirihuau)
- Neuquén Province (Estancia Fortin Chacabuco)

Episode summary

- At the start of this leg, teams were instructed to travel by bus to San Carlos de Bariloche, Argentina. Once there, teams had to drive to El Boliche Viejo in Nahuel Huapi. Teams had to win a game of five-card stud against a Travelocity Roaming Gnome in order to receive the gnome with their next clue on its base, which directed them to the Peña Gaucha. Teams had to keep their gnome with them for the remainder of the leg.
- In this leg's Roadblock, one team member used a lasso to rope a target 18 feet (5.5 m) away and pull it toward them in order to receive their next clue.
- After the Roadblock, teams had to drive to Puente Ñirihuau and find their next clue.
- This leg's Detour was a choice between Horse Sense or Horse Power. In Horse Sense, teams were given a set of directions and, using only a stationary compass, had to find a bag of loot buried in a field. They then delivered the bag to a bandit, and if the markings on their bag matched the coordinates given to them, he gave the team a coin imprinted with the name of the Pit Stop. In Horse Power, teams went to a polo field and, using a wooden practice horse, had to score a goal within nine strokes in order to receive a trophy imprinted with the name of the Pit Stop.
- After the Detour, teams had to check in at the Pit Stop: Estancia Fortin Chacabuco in Neuquén Province.

=== Leg 4 (Argentina → Germany) ===
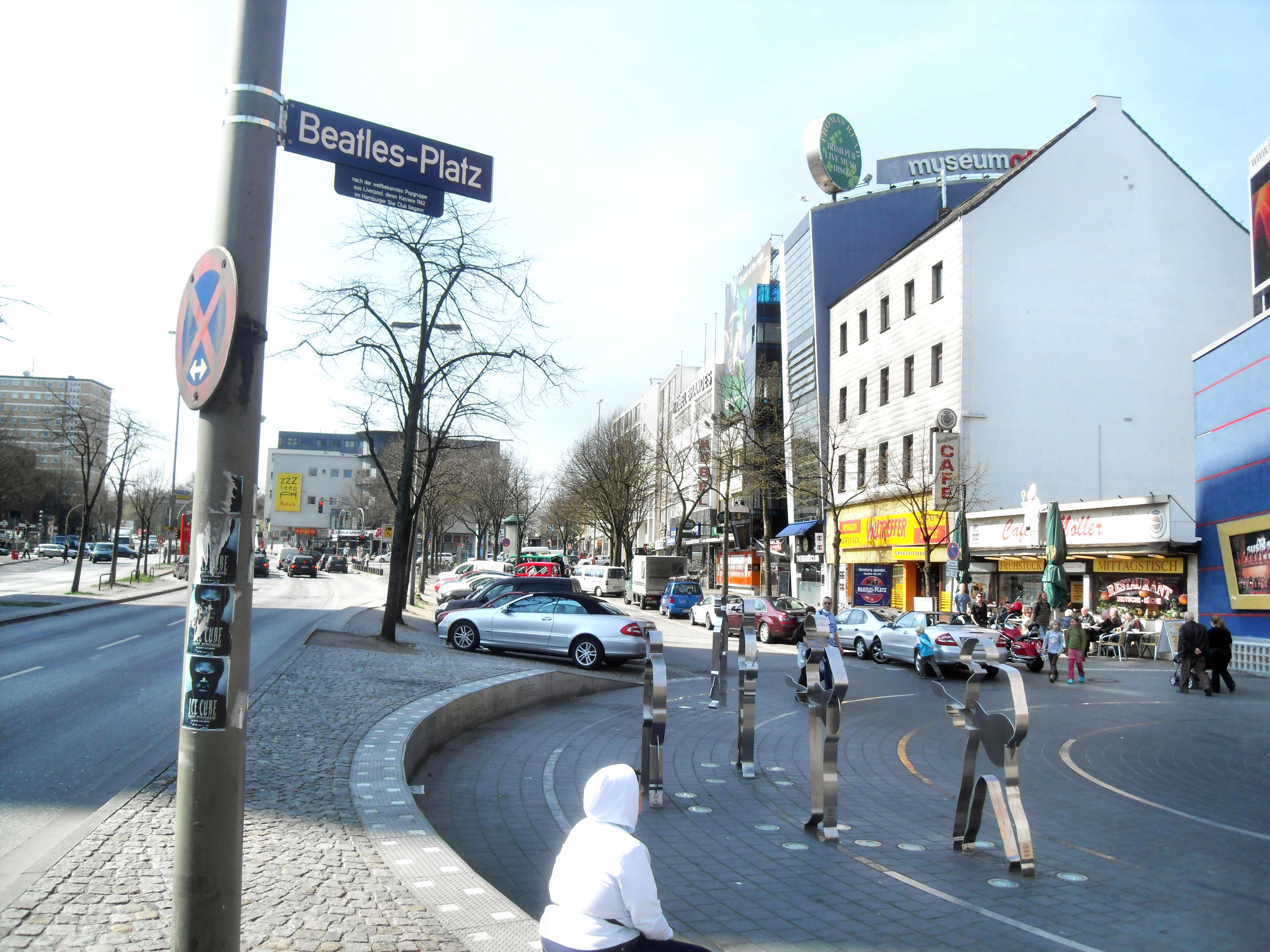
Teams finished this leg near the Beatles-Platz, paying tribute to Hamburg's role in The Beatles' early history.

- Episode 4: "We Are No Longer in the Bible Belt" (March 7, 2010)
- Prize: Two US$5,000 pre-loaded Discover Cards (awarded to Louie & Michael)

Locations

- Neuquén Province (Estancia Fortin Chacabuco)
- San Carlos de Bariloche → Frankfurt, Germany
- Frankfurt → Hamburg
- Hamburg (Jungfernstieg)
- Hamburg (Port of Hamburg)
- Hamburg (Altonaer Rathaus (in German) – Kaiser Wilhelm I Statue)
- Hamburg (Adolf-Jäger-Kampfbahn Stadium (in German) or Alt-Hamburger Bürgerhaus)
- Hamburg (Haifischbar (in German))
- Hamburg (Beatles-Platz)
- Hamburg (Reeperbahn – Indra Musikclub)

Episode summary

- At the start of this leg, teams were instructed to fly to Frankfurt, Germany, and then travel by train to Hamburg.
- After arriving in Hamburg, teams had to travel to the Jungfernstieg. There, teams encountered an Intersection, which required two teams to mutually join together to complete the following task. The teams were paired up thusly: Dan & Jordan and Carol & Brandy, Jet & Cord and Louie & Michael, Brent & Caite and Jordan & Jeff, and Steve & Allie and Joe & Heidi.
- In this leg's Roadblock, one member from each of the newly-joined teams had to take the S-Bahn to the Port of Hamburg and complete a 150-foot (46 m) tandem bungee jump in order to receive their next clue, which they couldn't open until they reunited with their partners. After this task, teams were no longer joined.
- After the Roadblock, teams had to travel to the Kaiser Wilhelm I Statue at the Altonaer Rathaus and find their next clue.
- This leg's Detour was a choice between Soccer or Sauerkraut. In Soccer, teams traveled to the Adolf-Jäger-Kampfbahn Stadium and had to kick soccer balls from the penalty mark through five targets located in the goal in order to receive their next clue. In Sauerkraut, teams traveled to Alt-Hamburger Bürgerhaus restaurant and had to eat a plate of sauerkraut while a band played a song called the "Sauerkraut Polka". Teams had to finish the plate before the end of the song in order to receive their next clue. If the song ended before teams finished, they had to start over with a new plate of sauerkraut.
- After the Detour, teams had to travel to the Haifischbar, where each team had to drink a boot of beer in order to receive their next clue. Teams were directed to the Beatles-Platz and then had to search through Hamburg's red-light district for the Pit Stop: the Indra Musikclub.

Additional note

- This was a non-elimination leg.

=== Leg 5 (Germany → France) ===
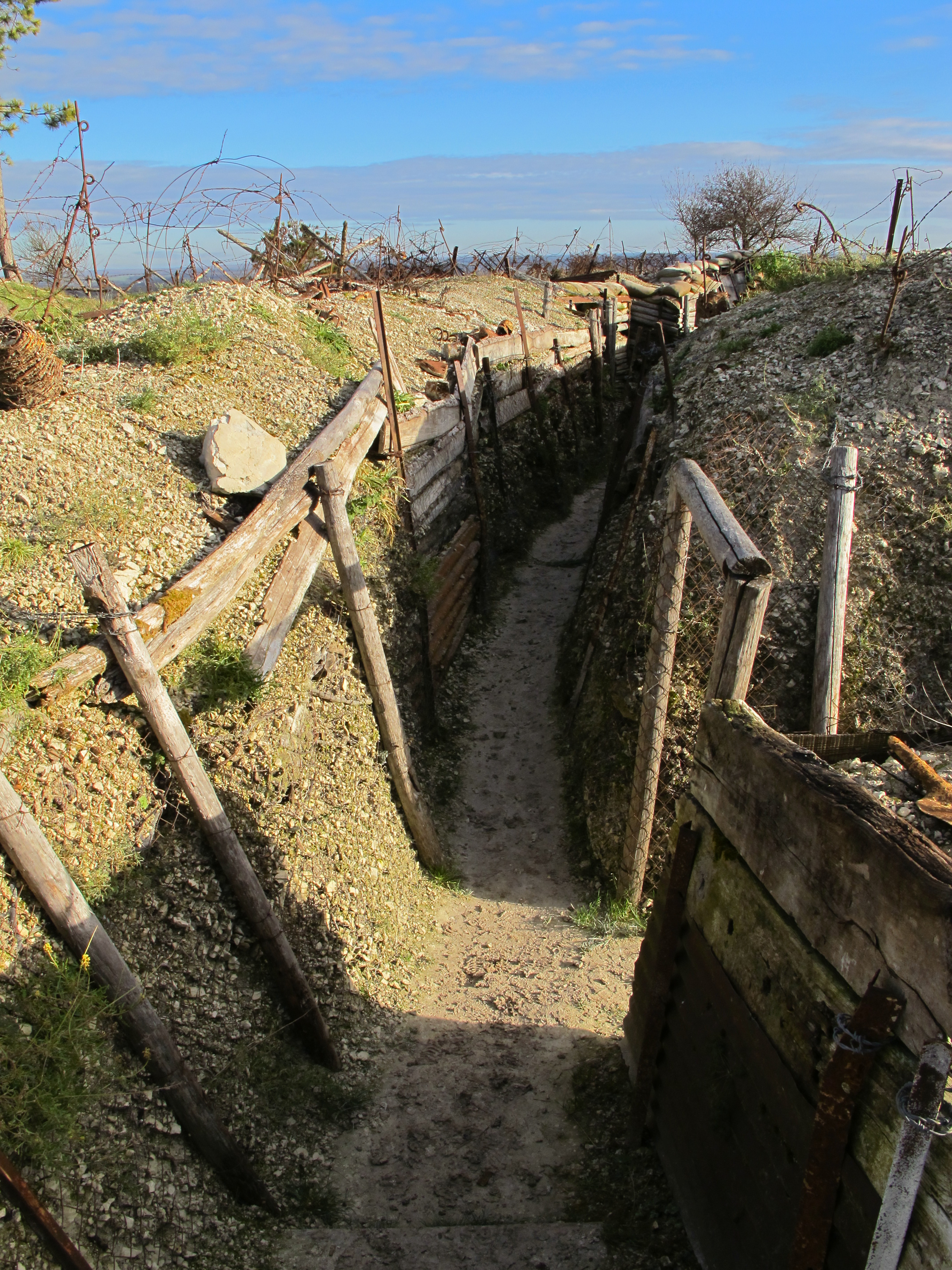
Much of the fifth leg was set in the trenches of Massiges during an historical reenactment of World War I.

- Episode 5: "I Think We're Fighting the Germans, Right?" (March 14, 2010)
- Prize: Two 55" HD TVs (awarded to Louie & Michael)
- Eliminated: Joe & Heidi

Locations

- Hamburg → Les Monthairons, France (Château des Monthairons (in French))
- Sainte-Menehould (Boulangerie Defontaine)
- Massiges (La Main de Massiges (in French))
- Massiges (Church of Massiges) → Wargemoulin-Hurlus (Mairie)

Episode summary

- During the Pit Stop, all teams boarded a bus and traveled from Hamburg to an unknown destination (Les Monthairons, France). Teams began the leg at the Château des Monthairons and were instructed to purchase a fresh baguette at the Boulangerie Defontaine. Their next clue was baked into the baguette and directed them to La Main de Massiges.
- For their Speed Bump, Jordan & Jeff had to reinforce a trench wall with branches before they could continue racing.
- This leg's Detour was a choice between In the Trenches or Under Fire. For both tasks, teams dressed as World War I-era American soldiers. In In the Trenches, teams traveled through trenches to a telegraph, where they deciphered a message in Morse code – "We will prevail; Vive la France" – and presented their deciphered message to the French sergeant in exchange for the next clue. In Under Fire, teams crawled 100 feet (30 m) under barbed wire to receive a message – "The war is over; Vive la liberté" – from a man in a foxhole. They then crawled back to present the message to the sergeant. After completing either task, teams had to send their message to "headquarters" via carrier pigeon in order to receive their next clue.
- After the Detour, teams had to travel south down a road until they reached their next clue. Teams then had to continue to the Church of Massiges, where they changed out of their doughboy gear and into inaugural Tour de France bicycling gear, and then rode on antique bicycles along a four-mile (6.4 km) course to the Pit Stop: the town hall of Wargemoulin-Hurlus.

Additional notes

- Louie & Michael chose to use the Blind U-Turn on Joe & Heidi.
- Joe & Heidi failed to complete the second Detour option that they had to do as a result of being U-Turned. After all of the other teams had already checked in at the Pit Stop, Phil came out to the Detour location to inform them of their elimination.

=== Leg 6 (France) ===
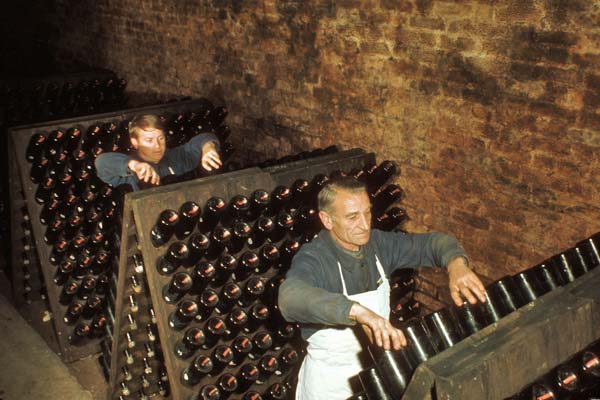
This leg's tasks paid tributes to France's champagne industry in Champagne-Ardenne, home of prestigious champagne houses.

- Episode 6: "Cathy Drone?" (March 21, 2010)
- Prize: A trip for two to Cancún, Mexico (awarded to Louie & Michael)
- Eliminated: Jordan & Jeff

Locations

- Massiges (La Main de Massiges)
- Reims (Reims Cathedral – Joan of Arc Statue)
- Épernay (Leclerc Briant)
- Pierry (Château de la Marquetterie (in French))
- Épernay (l'ORCCA – La Maison Gallice)

Episode summary

- At the start of this leg, teams had to drive to the Reims Cathedral and find a woman playing a musical saw, who had their next clue: a cork from a bottle of Leclerc Briant, whose winery was their next destination.
- In this leg's Roadblock, one team member had to rappel 100 feet (30 m) into the chalk cellars of Leclerc Briant's winery and search for a bottle of champagne marked with a small yellow and red striped flag amongst the riddling racks. Once they found the bottle, they returned to the surface and used a traditional sabrage technique to open the bottle, the force of which propelled out their next clue.
- After the Roadblock, teams had to drive to the Château de la Marquetterie in Pierry, where they found their next clue.
- This leg's Detour was a choice between Tower or Terra. In Tower, teams had to stack champagne saucers into a 15-level pyramid with only one glass on the top level, and then pour the entire contents of a magnum of champagne onto the top of the pyramid without breaking any of the glasses in order to receive their next clue. In Terra, teams had to search the one-square-kilometre (250-acre) vineyards for a cluster of wine grapes marked with an Amazing Race flag, which they could exchange for their next clue.
- After the Detour, teams had to check in at the Pit Stop: La Maison Gallice in Épernay.

=== Leg 7 (France → Seychelles) ===
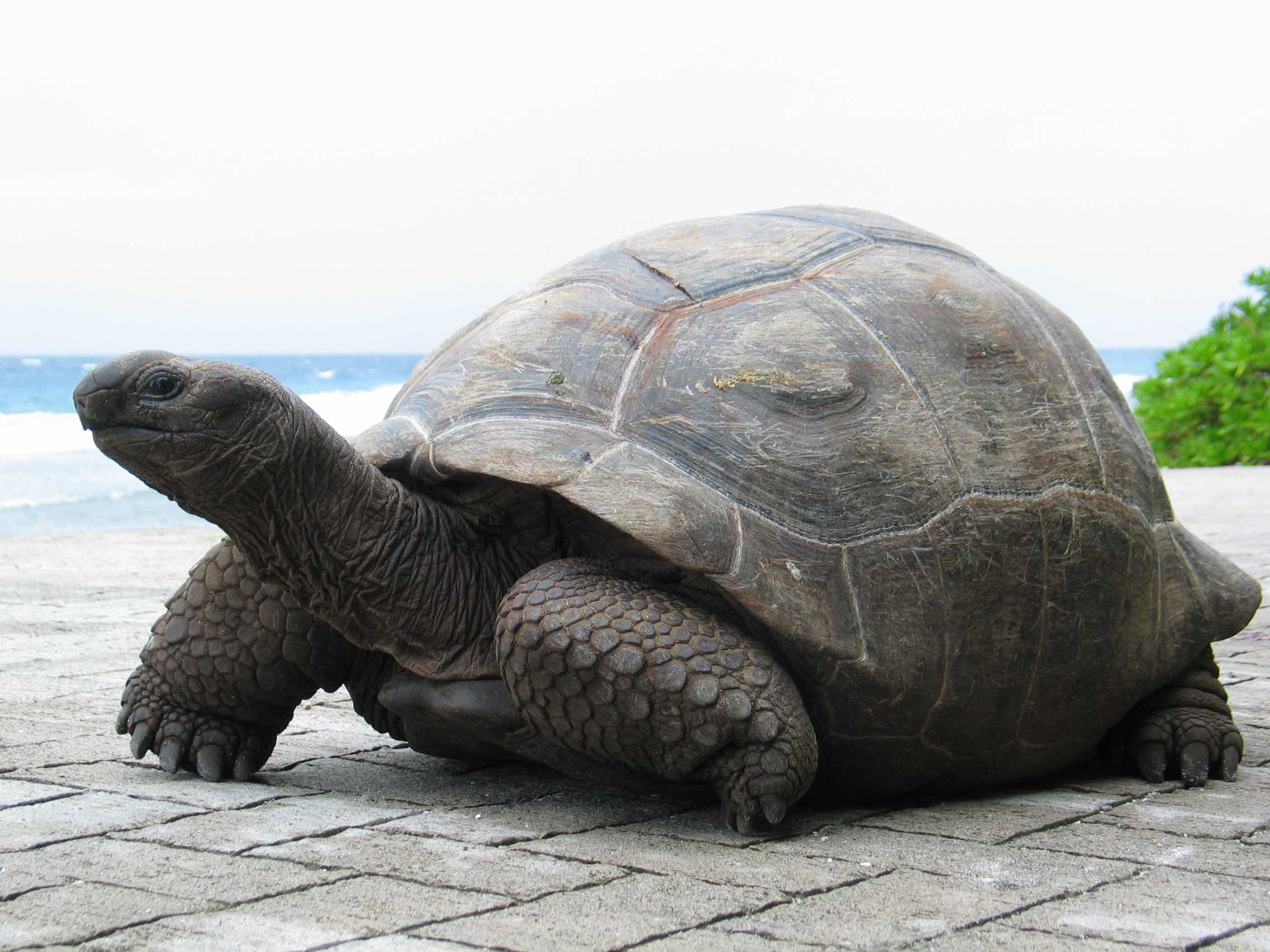
While in the Seychelles, teams had to use a banana to lure a 100-year-old and 500-pound (230 kg) Aldabra giant tortoise for one of the Detour options.

- Episode 7: "Anonymous?" (March 28, 2010)
- Prize: A dinner on the beach and massages in the Seychelles, and $7,000 for each team member (awarded to Steve & Allie)

Locations

- Épernay (l'ORCCA – La Maison Gallice)
- Paris → Victoria, Seychelles (Seychelles International Airport)
- Victoria → L'Union (La Digue Helipad)
- L'Union (L'Union Estate & La Digue Marina)
- La Passe → St. Pierre Island
- St. Pierre Island → Praslin
- Anse Volbert (Paradise Sun Hotel)

Episode summary

- At the start of this leg, teams were instructed to fly from Paris to the Seychelles. After arriving in Victoria, teams had to find a marked kiosk in the airport and take a number. The first three teams could then board one of three helicopters leaving at the same time to the island of La Digue, where they found their next clue. The last three teams departed one hour later.
- This leg's Detour was a choice between Turtle Toddle or Ox Trot. In Turtle Toddle, teams used a banana to lure a 500-pound (230 kg), 100-year-old giant tortoise across a marked path on a lawn. Once the turtle crossed the finish line, both team members had to deliver a bunch of bananas to a fruit merchant 1.5 miles (2.4 km) away in order to receive their next clue. In Ox Trot, teams pulled a cart to a clearing where they had to load a pile of coconuts. After an ox was hitched to their cart, teams had to deliver the coconuts to the same fruit merchant in order to receive their clue. If teams lost any of their coconuts, they had to retrieve them in order to complete the task.
- After the Detour, teams had to swim to a marked boat and travel to a buoy near St. Pierre Island, where the captain gave them their next clue.
- In this leg's Roadblock, one team member had to dive into the ocean and retrieve one of seven bottles tied to a platform in the water.
- After the Roadblock, teams were taken to near the shoreline of Praslin and had to swim to land. Once on shore, teams had to empty the contents of their bottle to reveal a puzzle map that, when assembled, led them to the Pit Stop at the Paradise Sun Hotel.

Additional notes

- Due to limited availability of flights, teams were provided tickets on the same flight to the Seychelles.
- This was a non-elimination leg.

=== Leg 8 (Seychelles → Malaysia) ===
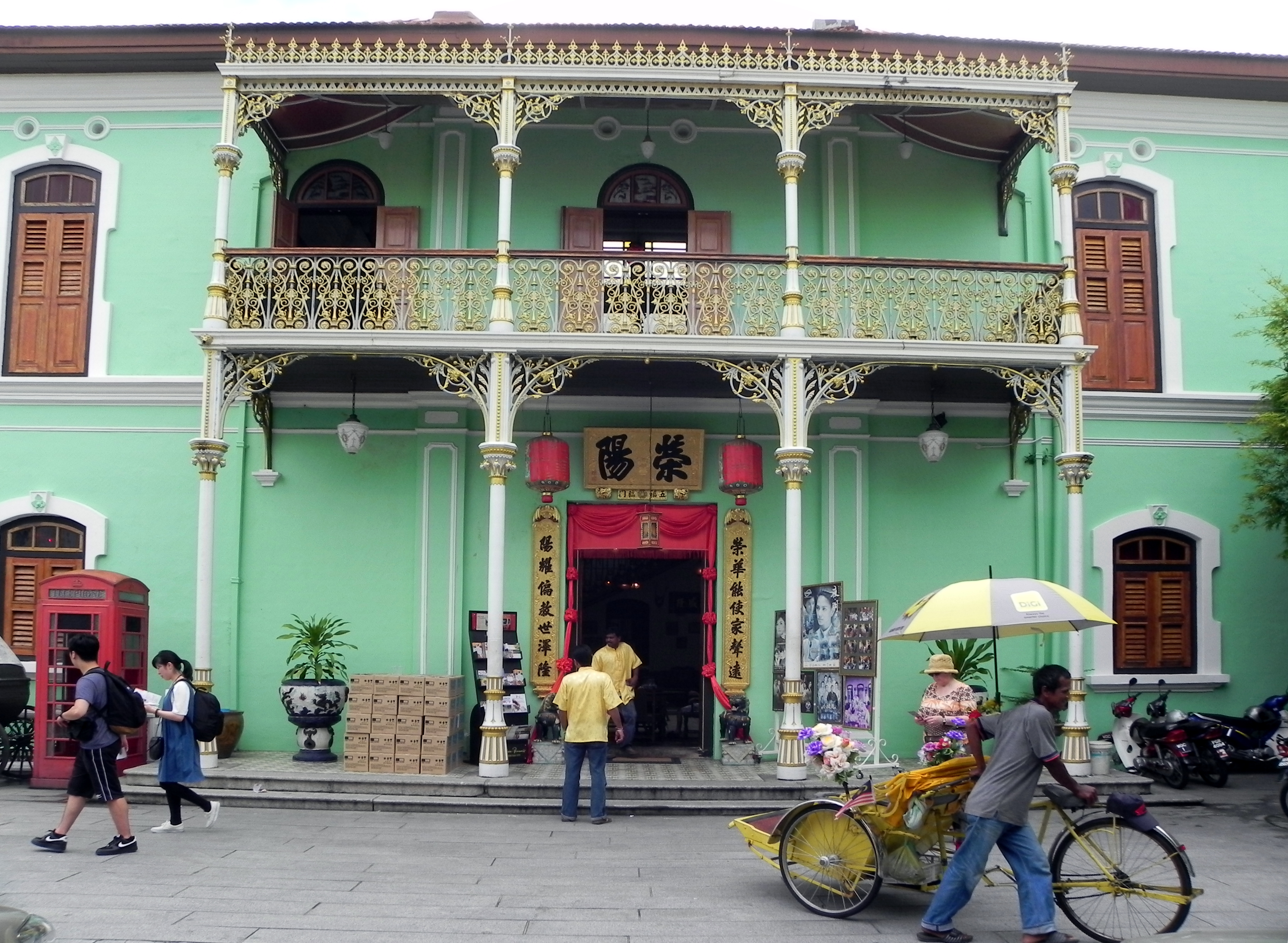
Teams ended this leg at the Pinang Peranakan Mansion in Penang's capital city of George Town.

- Episode 8: "You're Like Jason Bourne, Right?" (April 4, 2010)
- Prize: A trip for two to Maui, Hawaii (awarded to Jet & Cord)
- Eliminated: Steve & Allie

Locations

- Anse Volbert (Paradise Sun Hotel)
- Baie Saint Anne → Victoria
- Victoria → George Town, Malaysia
- Bayan Lepas (Snake Temple)
- George Town (Tien Kong Than Temple or Esplanade)
- Teluk Bahang (Tropical Spice Garden)
- Teluk Bahang (Kuil Sri Singamuga Kaliamman)
- George Town (Pinang Peranakan Mansion)

Episode summary

- At the start of this leg, teams were instructed to travel by boat to Victoria, and then fly to George Town, Malaysia. Once there, teams had to travel to the Snake Temple, where they found their next clue.
- This leg's Detour was a choice between Buddhist Tradition or Chinese Custom. In Buddhist Tradition, teams had to travel to the Tien Kong Than Temple and carry 12 large joss sticks to the top of the temple. After arranging them in the proper order, teams lit them and then received their next clue. In Chinese Custom, teams had to travel to the Esplanade, where they participated in the Chinese New Year tradition of balancing large flags on their foreheads and running across the esplanade. After both team members made it across the esplanade without letting their flags fall, they received their next clue.
- After the Detour, teams had to travel to Kuil Sri Singamuga Kaliamman in Teluk Bahang, where they found their next clue.
- For their Speed Bump, Jet & Cord had to travel to the Tropical Spice Garden, where they found a woman crushing spices for tea. Then, by smell, they had to choose the correct prepared tea and serve it to a guru sitting on a swing. Once the guru finished drinking the tea, they could continue racing.
- In this leg's Roadblock, one team member had to break open several coconuts until they found one that had colored flesh. They then had to build a traditional Hindu offering called a float and give it to the waiting Gurukkal, who sent it out to sea and then gave racers their next clue directing them to the Pit Stop: the Pinang Peranakan Mansion in George Town.

=== Leg 9 (Malaysia → Singapore) ===
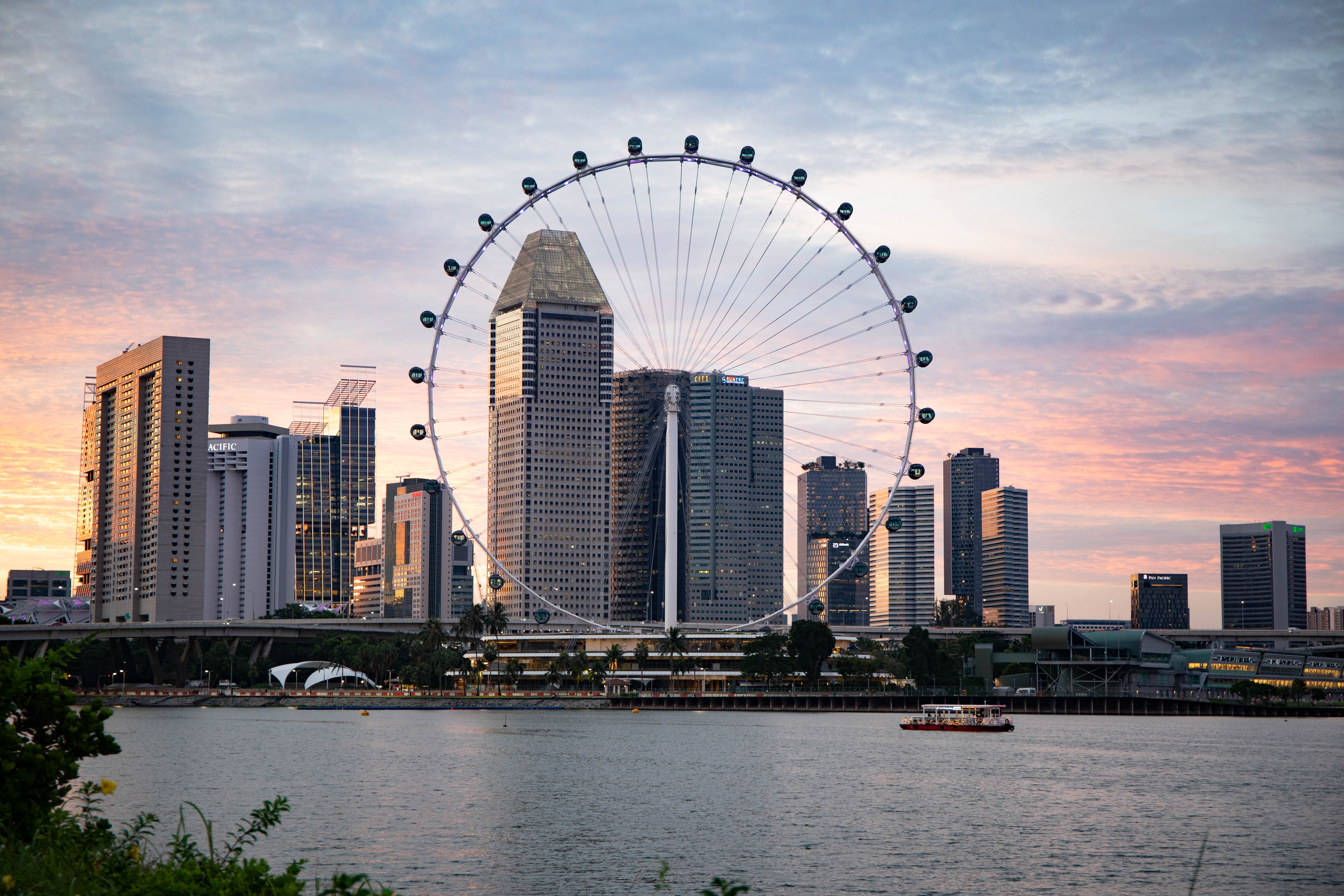
The only Fast Forward of this season took place at the Singapore Flyer: the tallest Ferris wheel in the world at that time.

- Episode 9: "Dumb Did Us In" (April 11, 2010)
- Prize: A pair of motorcycles (awarded to Dan & Jordan)
- Eliminated: Carol & Brandy

Locations

- George Town (Pinang Peranakan Mansion)
- Sungai Nibong → Kuala Lumpur
- Kuala Lumpur → Singapore
- Singapore (Victoria Theatre and Concert Hall)
- Singapore (Singapore Flyer)
- Singapore (Speakers' Corner or Rochor Road)
- Singapore (Istana Park)
- Singapore (ASL Marine Shipyard)
- Singapore (Sentosa – MegaZip Adventure Park)
- Singapore (Marina Barrage)

Episode summary

- At the start of this leg, teams were instructed to travel by bus to Kuala Lumpur and then by train to Singapore. Once there, teams had to travel to the Victoria Theatre and Concert Hall and find Allan Wu, the host of The Amazing Race Asia, who gave them their next clue.
- In this season's only Fast Forward, one team traveled to the Singapore Flyer, where they had to climb out of an observation pod at the top of the 541-foot (165 m) Ferris wheel and cross a ladder to the next pod. Dan & Jordan won the Fast Forward.
- This leg's Detour was a choice between Pounding The Drums or Pounding The Pavement. In Pounding The Drums, teams traveled to Speakers' Corner, where they had to learn a complex drum routine for a lion dance performance and correctly perform the routine with a dance troupe in order to receive their next clue. In Pounding The Pavement, teams traveled to an open area on Rochor Road, where they had to deliver supplies to a marked ice cream cart and sell 25 Singaporean-style ice cream sandwiches in order to receive their next clue.
- After the Detour, teams were instructed to find their next clue at the intersection of their "last Pit Stop city" (Penang) and Orchard Road, sending them to Istana Park at the intersection of Penang Road and Orchard Road. Teams then had to travel to ASL Marine Shipyard in order to find their next clue.
- In this leg's Roadblock, one team member had to inspect an anchor chain by counting the number of links, while dealing with noise created by the workers at the port and announcements from a loudspeaker, and write the correct number down on a clipboard in order to receive their next clue.
- After the Roadblock, teams had to travel to MegaZip Adventure Park, where they found their next clue instructing them to ride the MegaZip, a 1,476-foot (450 m) long zipline, in order to receive their next clue directing them to the Pit Stop: the Marina Barrage.

Additional note

- Brent & Caite chose to use the U-Turn on Carol & Brandy.

=== Leg 10 (Singapore → China) ===
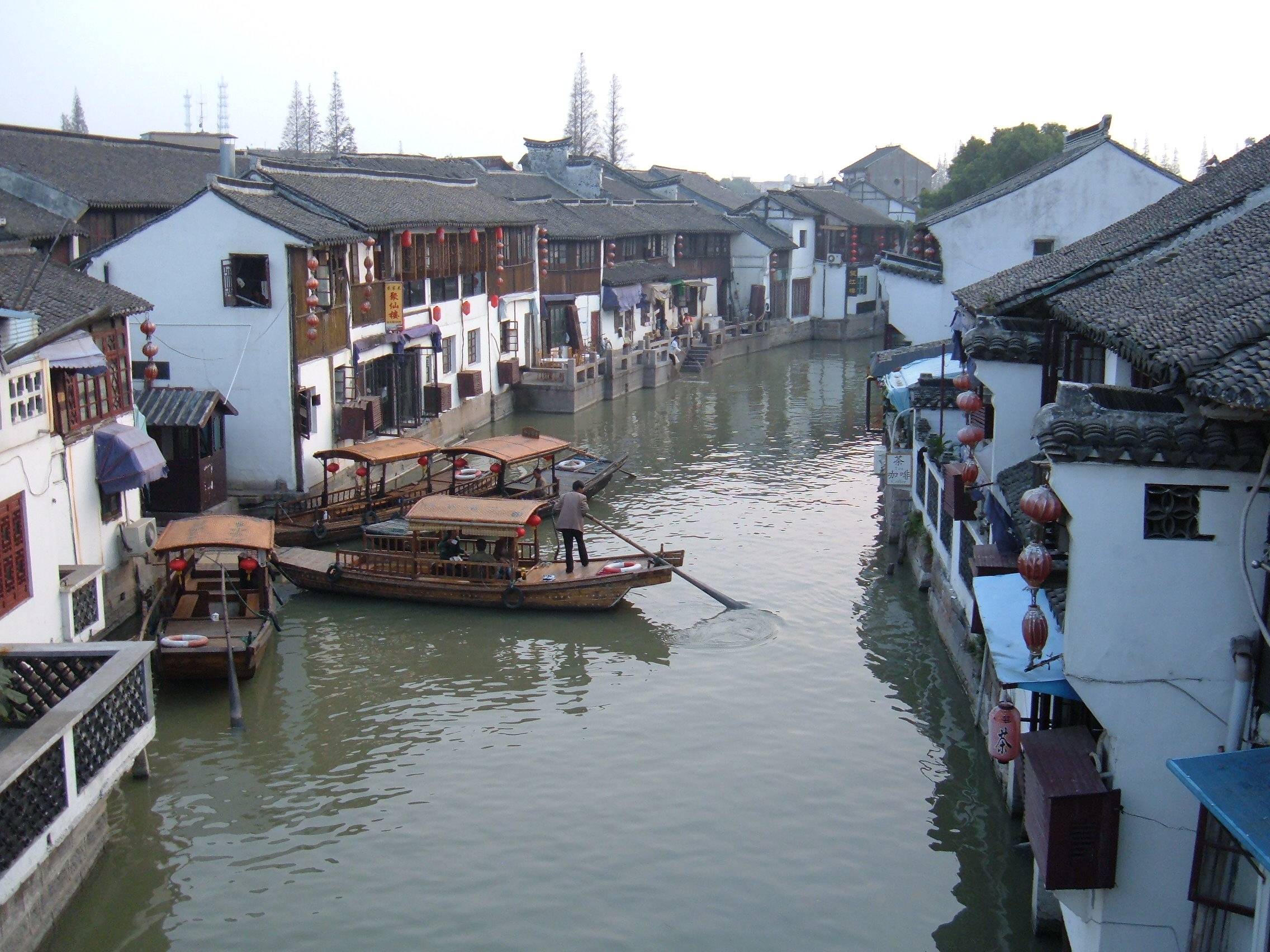
After arriving in Shanghai, teams visited the town of Zhujiajiao in the Qingpu District.

- Episode 10: "I Feel Like I'm in, Like, Sicily" (April 25, 2010)
- Prize: A trip for two to Alaska (awarded to Jet & Cord)

Locations

- Singapore (Marina Barrage)
- Singapore → Shanghai, China
- Shanghai (Zhujiajiao)
- Shanghai (Tianzifang – Deke Erh Art Center)
- Shanghai (Hongkou Football Stadium)
- Shanghai (Shanghai Science and Technology Museum)

Episode summary

- At the start of this leg, teams were instructed to fly to Shanghai, China. Once there, teams had to travel to Zhujiajiao and travel on foot to a boat dock, where they rode a boat to their next clue.
- In this leg's first Roadblock, one team member had to make one kilogram (2.2 lb) of lamian noodles in order to receive their next clue from He Pingping, the world's shortest man.
- After the first Roadblock, teams had to travel to the Deke Erh Art Center in Tianzifang, where they entered a fashion studio and chose a sketch of an outfit. They then had to choose the correct pieces of clothing as shown in the sketch and give them to a fashion model to wear. If they chose the right clothing and accessories, the fashion designer gave them their next clue, which sent teams to Hongkou Football Stadium.
- In this leg's second Roadblock, the team member who did not perform the previous Roadblock had to assemble a 96-piece puzzle and give the puzzle pieces to a group of fans in the bleachers. If assembled correctly, the puzzle pieces, when flipped over, revealed the seat number where teams could find their next clue.
- After the second Roadblock, teams had to travel by Shanghai Metro to the Pit Stop: the Shanghai Science and Technology Museum.

Additional notes

- He Pingping died about three months after the episode was filmed and one month before it aired. The episode concluded with the message in his memory.
- This was a non-elimination leg.

=== Leg 11 (China) ===
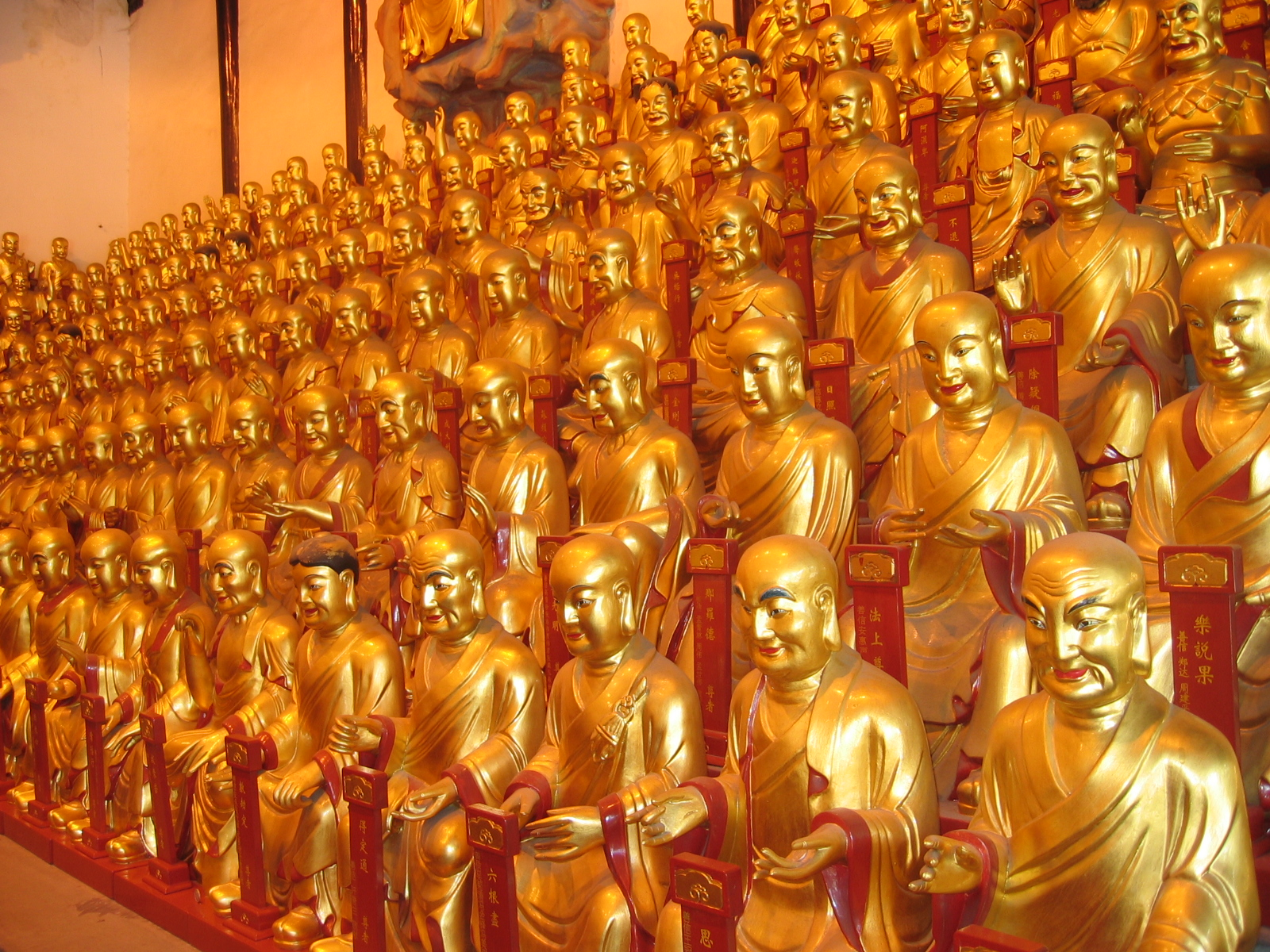
In this leg's Roadblock, one team member had to count all of the statues in the Longhua Temple's Arhat Hall.

- Episode 11: "They Don't Even Understand Their Own Language" (May 2, 2010)
- Prize: A trip for two to the Costa del Sol in Spain (awarded to Brent & Caite)
- Eliminated: Louie & Michael

Locations

- Shanghai (Shanghai Science and Technology Museum)
- Shanghai (Garden Bridge)
- Shanghai (Longhua Temple)
- Shanghai (Yuyuan Garden)
- Shanghai (Art Stone Store)
- Shanghai (Riverside Promenade (in Chinese))

Episode summary

- At the start of this leg, teams were instructed to travel to the Garden Bridge and find their next clue.
- For their Speed Bump, Louie & Michael had to participate in a good luck ritual by each tossing one coin into the top opening of the large incense burner on the Longhua Temple grounds before they could continue racing.
- In this leg's Roadblock, one team member had to enter Arhat Hall at the Longhua Temple and count all of the golden statues in the room in order to receive their next clue. If their guess was incorrect, they had to wait ten minutes before making another guess.
- After the Roadblock, teams traveled by motorcycle to the Yuyuan Garden, where they found their next clue.
- This season's final Detour was a choice between Pork Chops or Pork Dumplings. In Pork Chops, teams entered an art stone store and looked through several hundred special stone stamps called chops for the two that had a pig on the bottom and one with each of their names in order to receive their next clue. In Pork Dumplings, teams would have had to travel to Nanxiang Steamed Bun Restaurant and deliver ten orders of xiaolongbao across the market in order to receive their next clue. All teams chose Pork Chops.
- After the Detour, teams had to check in at the Pit Stop: the Riverside Promenade.

Additional note

- Bao Xishun, the world's tallest man at the time, was the Pit Stop greeter in this leg.

=== Leg 12 (China → United States) ===
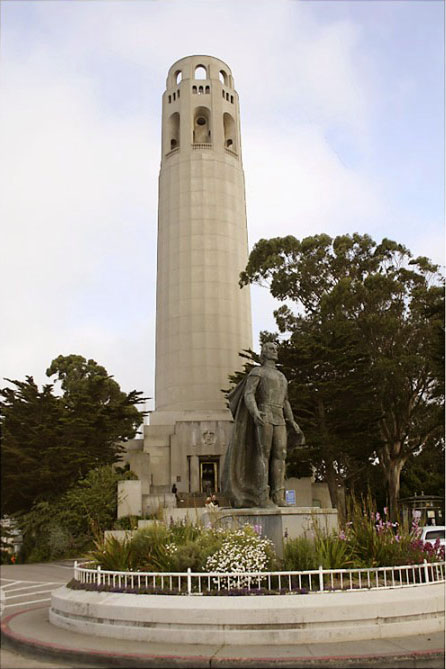
For the final Roadblock on The Amazing Race 16, teams visited the famous Coit Tower in San Francisco's Telegraph Hill, which one team member had to climb from the outside.

- Episode 12: "Huger than Huge" (May 9, 2010)
- Prize: US$1,000,000
- Winners: Dan & Jordan
- Runners-up: Jet & Cord
- Third place: Brent & Caite

Locations

- Shanghai (Riverside Promenade (in Chinese))
- Shanghai → San Francisco, California
- San Francisco (Fort Point – Battery Godfrey)
- San Francisco (Coit Tower)
- San Francisco (Letterman Digital Arts Center – Yoda Fountain & Industrial Light & Magic)
- San Francisco (Fairmont San Francisco – Tonga Room)
- San Francisco (Great American Music Hall)
- San Francisco (Candlestick Park)

Episode summary

- At the start of this leg, teams were instructed to fly to San Francisco, California. Once there, teams had to travel to Battery Godfrey in Fort Point in order to receive their next clue, which was a riddle: "I was built in 1933. I'm 210 feet tall. My insides are lined with mural from 26 different artists. What am I?". Teams had to figure out that their next destination was Coit Tower.
- In this season's final Roadblock, one team member had to use an ascender to reach the top archways of Coit Tower in order to get their next clue before being lowered back to the ground.
- After the Roadblock, teams had to travel to Industrial Light & Magic and find their next clue by the Yoda Fountain. Then, one team member had to put on a motion capture suit and enter a sound stage while their partner directed them to walk an avatar through a virtual course based on Star Wars: The Clone Wars. After getting through two levels of the course, the directing partner had to copy down their next clue from a computer screen which directed them to the Tonga Room.
- Teams had to carry a trunk from the Tonga Room to their next location: the Great American Music Hall. Once there, teams opened their trunk, which contained eight psychedelic posters of the eliminated teams and three posters for the non-elimination legs. Teams had to arrange the posters in chronological order in order to receive their final clue.

Leg	Team
1	Dana & Adrian
2	Jody & Shannon
3	Monique & Shawne
4	Non-Elimination
5	Joe & Heidi
6	Jordan & Jeff
7	Non-Elimination
8	Steve & Allie
9	Carol & Brandy
10	Non-Elimination
11	Louie & Michael

- The final clue was a portion of the "Jack Be Nimble" nursery rhyme; teams had to figure out that the missing word "candlestick" referred to the location of the finish line: Candlestick Park.

== Elimination Station ==
The first five eliminated teams were sequestered at a villa in Puerto Vallarta, Mexico, to await the finale. CBS posted short videos on its website after each episode to show the eliminated teams interacting at the villa.

- After Leg 1, Dana & Adrian were the first team eliminated. They expressed their disappointment after Adrian's second attempt failed during the Roadblock task. Adrian is terribly afraid of heights, and he wanted to kiss Dana to reaffirm their relationship. They discussed their marriage, had a tour on a beach, and saw whales in the ocean.
- After Leg 2, Jody & Shannon were the second team eliminated. Jody voiced her regrets that she did the Roadblock instead of Shannon. Adrian was surprised to hear that Jody had not hoped or expected to win The Amazing Race, but Shannon still insisted that they could have won. The teams were awarded an elemental spa with treatments based on fire, earth, water, and air.
- After Leg 3, Monique & Shawne were the third team eliminated. The two previously eliminated teams were shocked to see Monique & Shawne who explained how they had a long day which led to their elimination and were saddened at missing their daughters' birthdays. The next day, the teams went to Las Juantas Y Los Veranos to make tequila, which included Adrian cutting open a blue agave in 6 minutes and 9 seconds.
- Leg 4 was a non-elimination leg. The three eliminated teams bonded at the villa while Shannon was writing in her journal. Monique and Shawne suggested bringing Shannon to the beach, after which all the teams went. Shawne was given a leg and foot massage, while Shannon got her hair beaded, and Monique shared with Shannon how to win the Mexican guys with eye action.
- After Leg 5, Joe & Heidi were the fourth team eliminated. They arrived while Adrian and Shannon were playing a game of table tennis. Jody & Shannon expressed their surprise and disappointment at seeing Joe & Heidi arrive, while Adrian was glad to have another man at the villa. Joe & Heidi expressed their frustration and explained how they arrived at the conclusion that Louie & Michael had Blind U-Turned them. Later, the teams went to town to shop. Joe tried to bargain with a store owner over the price of some jewelry for Heidi, which offended the owner.
- After Leg 6, Jordan & Jeff were the fifth team eliminated. All the teams at the villa had a meal. As Jordan & Jeff arrived at the villa, they explained the circumstances that led to their elimination (struggling with navigation and the language barrier). They believed that Louie & Michael would be in the top 3. Joe again shared his disdain for Louie & Michael in a confessional. Jeff expressed his bitterness at having been evicted from Big Brother and now eliminated from The Amazing Race as he compares Elimination Station and Big Brother and Jury House. However, Jordan was satisfied from being in Elimination Station. The teams later went on a snorkeling trip. While on the trip, Monique & Shawne suffered from seasickness, and Heidi helped Adrian become comfortable in the water. The snorkeling trip also helped ease Jeff's bitterness at being eliminated.
- Leg 7 was a non-elimination leg. At the pool, Adrian, Jeff, and Joe discussed how Louie & Michael U-Turned Joe & Heidi, because the detectives disliked them for personal reasons. The eliminated teams watched an exciting Mexican dance, and many of the racers joined in the dance. Jody performed a solo by playing the drum, which impressed Shannon. Later in the day, Joe shared with Heidi the main reason why Louie and Michael U-Turned them. Heidi added that if Joe were to meet Louie and Michael, he would confront them about it and how it affected the outcome of the season.
- After Leg 8, Steve & Allie were the sixth team eliminated. At 2:00 a.m. the eliminated teams gathered to speculate on the next eliminated team. Steve & Allie called the villa, and Monique picked up the phone. Everyone was surprised and disappointed to hear that Steve & Allie were eliminated, especially Shannon, since Steve & Allie were the other generational team. Joe then asked Steve about Louie & Michael's current situation in the season. Steve told Joe that his team was too strong and was a threat, which resulted in the U-Turn. Steve shared that bad decisions and a bad cab resulted in their elimination. Steve also said that either Jet & Cord or Louie & Michael would win the season.
- After Leg 9, Carol & Brandy were the seventh team eliminated. When Carol & Brandy called the villa early in the morning, the other eliminated teams were shocked and disappointed to hear of their elimination, especially Shannon, who wanted an all-female team to win. Carol & Brandy talked about the U-Turn and their dislike for Brent & Caite that led to their elimination. In response, Jordan said that Carol & Brandy were probably jealous of Caite's beauty. However, Adrian agreed with Carol & Brandy that them getting U-Turned was personal and that it could have been used on either Jet & Cord or Louie & Michael. That evening, the eliminated racers got to watch a Mexican wrestling match in an outdoor coliseum. Jordan got to escort a wrestler to the ring, and Adrian, the most enthusiastic fan of the group, bought a wrestling mask as a souvenir.
- Leg 10 was a non-elimination leg. Jordan & Jeff talked with Dana and Adrian about how to strengthen their relationship. Then, all the teams at Elimination Station packed their bags and guessed where the final Leg would take place. Then left the villa and flew to End City.
- After Leg 11, Louie & Michael were the eighth and final team eliminated. Elimination Station showed the five eliminated teams arriving at the End City in San Francisco, California. After arriving in San Francisco, the teams checked into a hotel, settled into their rooms, and awaited the phone call from the eighth team eliminated. Monique & Shawne were happy to see the end of the season. Dana said that Joe & Heidi hoped that Louie & Michael were not in the Final Three because of their dislike for them after being U-Turned. Louie & Michael called to the hotel, and the eliminated teams were shocked and disappointed to hear that Louie & Michael were eliminated. Joe asked Louie & Michael if they still felt that they had used the U-Turn correctly. Michael said yes because he thought Joe & Heidi would be tough to beat once the route reached Asia. Despite Louie and Michael being eliminated, Joe was still not satisfied. Jeff told Joe that Louie & Michael U-Turned Joe & Heidi because of personal reasons, which led to harsh words between Joe and Jeff. Joe concluded by saying that he will confront Louie and Michael the next time he sees them.
- Leg 12 was the final leg of The Amazing Race 16. Elimination Station showed the Finish Line in Candlestick Park. All the eliminated teams were happy to find out which team they thought would win $1,000,000. Steve & Allie, Carol & Brandy, and Louie & Michael reunited with the other eliminated teams at the Finish Line. Shannon noticed that the Final Three teams were Dan & Jordan, Brent & Caite, and Jet & Cord. Dana said that it's anybody's race. All the eliminated teams were waiting to find out who would cross the Finish Line first and win the $1,000,000. Dan & Jordan were the first team to cross the Finish Line and win the $1 million; Jet & Cord came in 2nd, and Brent & Caite came in 3rd. Teams expressed their opinions about the final three teams at the Finish Line along with their joys and disappointments about the season and the learning experiences they could draw from the experience.

== Reception ==
=== Critical response ===
The Amazing Race 16 received mostly negative reviews. Andy Dehnart of reality blurred called it a "relatively weak season". Michael Hewitt of the Orange County Register wrote that "stupidity and luck ruled, and the game-changing plays came via two lethal U-Turns. As TV in general goes, season 16 was fine entertainment. But as 'The Amazing Race' goes, it was a disappointment." Daniel Fienberg of HitFix wrote that "there were too many dull teams and too many dull tasks and too little rewarding of excellence or punishing of the stupidity that ran amuck all season long. This group of contestants got to see some great locations and do some great stuff, but nothing was hard enough or challenging enough. Even a lame season of 'The Amazing Race' is still better than most of what passes for reality TV. Perhaps, though, this 'Amazing Race' installment has just paled in comparison to a classic All-Star edition of 'Survivor' currently being played out." In 2016, this season was ranked 24th out of the first 27 seasons by the Rob Has a Podcast Amazing Race correspondents. In 2024, Rhenn Taguiam of Game Rant placed this season within the bottom 13 out of 36. Conversely, Luke Dwyer of TV Fanatic called this season a blast, praised the locations and tasks, and said that it "was one of the more entertaining in recent memory and Dan and Jordan's victory was well deserved." Daron Aldridge of Box Office Prophets wrote "my thoughts on this entire season are positive."

== Ratings ==
No episode aired on April 18, 2010 due to CBS's broadcast of the Academy of Country Music Awards and CTV's broadcast of the Juno Awards.

=== U.S. Nielsen ratings ===
#	Airdate	Episode	Rating	Share	Rating/Share (18–49)	Viewers (millions)	Rank (Timeslot)	Rank (Night)
1	February 14, 2010	"Nanna Is Kickin' Your Butt"	5.1	8	2.8/7	9.07	1	1
2	February 21, 2010	"When the Cow Kicked Me in the Head"	5.2	8	2.9/7	9.11	1	1
3	February 28, 2010	"Run Like Scalded Dogs!"	5.8	9	3.2/8	10.24	2	4
4	March 7, 2010	"We Are No Longer in the Bible Belt"	4.5	7	2.6/7	8.05	2	4
5	March 14, 2010	"I Think We're Fighting the Germans, Right?"	5.8	10	3.0/9	10.10	1	3
6	March 21, 2010	"Cathy Drone?"	6.9	11	3.8/9	11.99	1	4
7	March 28, 2010	"Anonymous?"	7.2	11	3.9/10	12.73	1	3
8	April 4, 2010	"You're Like Jason Bourne, Right?"	5.2	9	2.7/8	9.14	1	3
9	April 11, 2010	"Dumb Did Us In"	6.9	11	3.4/10	11.88	1	3
10	April 25, 2010	"I Feel Like I'm in, Like, Sicily"	6.3	10	3.2/9	10.69	1	3
11	May 2, 2010	"They Don't Even Understand Their Own Language"	6.0	10	3.0/9	10.29	1	3
12	May 9, 2010	"Huger Than Huge"	6.0	11	2.9/9	10.63	1	3

- Episode 1, "Nanna Is Kickin' Your Butt" aired on Valentine's Day, which is also the first day of Chinese New Year and the opening week of the 2010 Winter Olympics.
- Episode 4, "We Are No Longer In The Bible Belt" had a considerably low number of viewers, most likely because it aired on the same night as the 82nd Academy Awards.
- Episode 7, "Anonymous?" had the most viewers and adults 25–54 rating since the November 4, 2007, episode of The Amazing Race 12, as well as the best numbers in adults 18–49 since the January 6, 2008, episode of the same season.
- Episode 8, "You're like Jason Bourne, right?" aired on Easter Sunday.
- Episode 12, "Huger Than Huge", the season finale, aired on Mother's Day. The show was down nearly two million viewers compared to the season 15 finale and was the lowest rated finale since season 4.

=== Canadian ratings ===
Canadian broadcaster CTV also aired The Amazing Race on Sundays at 8 p.m. The first three episodes were aired on A-Channel. When the show returned to the said network, episode four aired an hour earlier than its normal start time due to the network's broadcast of the 82nd Academy Awards.

#	Airdate	Episode	Viewers (millions)	Rank (week)
1	February 14, 2010	"Nanna Is Kickin' Your Butt"	—N/a	<#30
2	February 21, 2010	"When the Cow Kicked Me in the Head"	0.90	#16
3	February 28, 2010	"Run Like Scalded Dogs!"	0.88	#13
4	March 7, 2010	"We Are No Longer in the Bible Belt"	1.44	#21
5	March 14, 2010	"I Think We're Fighting the Germans, Right?"	2.53	#4
6	March 21, 2010	"Cathy Drone?"	2.00	#7
7	March 28, 2010	"Anonymous?"	2.47	#4
8	April 4, 2010	"You're Like Jason Bourne, Right?"	2.08	#6
9	April 11, 2010	"Dumb Did Us In"	2.29	#7
10	April 25, 2010	"I Feel Like I'm in, Like, Sicily"	2.18	#5
11	May 2, 2010	"They Don't Even Understand Their Own Language"	2.51	#3
12	May 9, 2010	"Huger Than Huge"	2.58	#3
