= Pilcaniyeu Department =

Pilcaniyeu Departamento Pilcaniyeu
- Department
- Location of Pilcaniyeu
- Coordinates: 41°07′21″S 70°43′18″W
- Country: Argentina
- Province: Río Negro Province
- Seat: Pilcaniyeu

Area
  - Total: 10,545 km^{2} (4,071 sq mi)

Population (2022)
  - Total: 9,373
  - Density: 0.8889/km^{2} (2.302/sq mi)

Pilcaniyeu is a department of the province of Río Negro (Argentina).

== Municipalities ==
- Ñirihuau
