= St. Pierre Island, Praslin =

Island in the Seychelles

St. Pierre Island
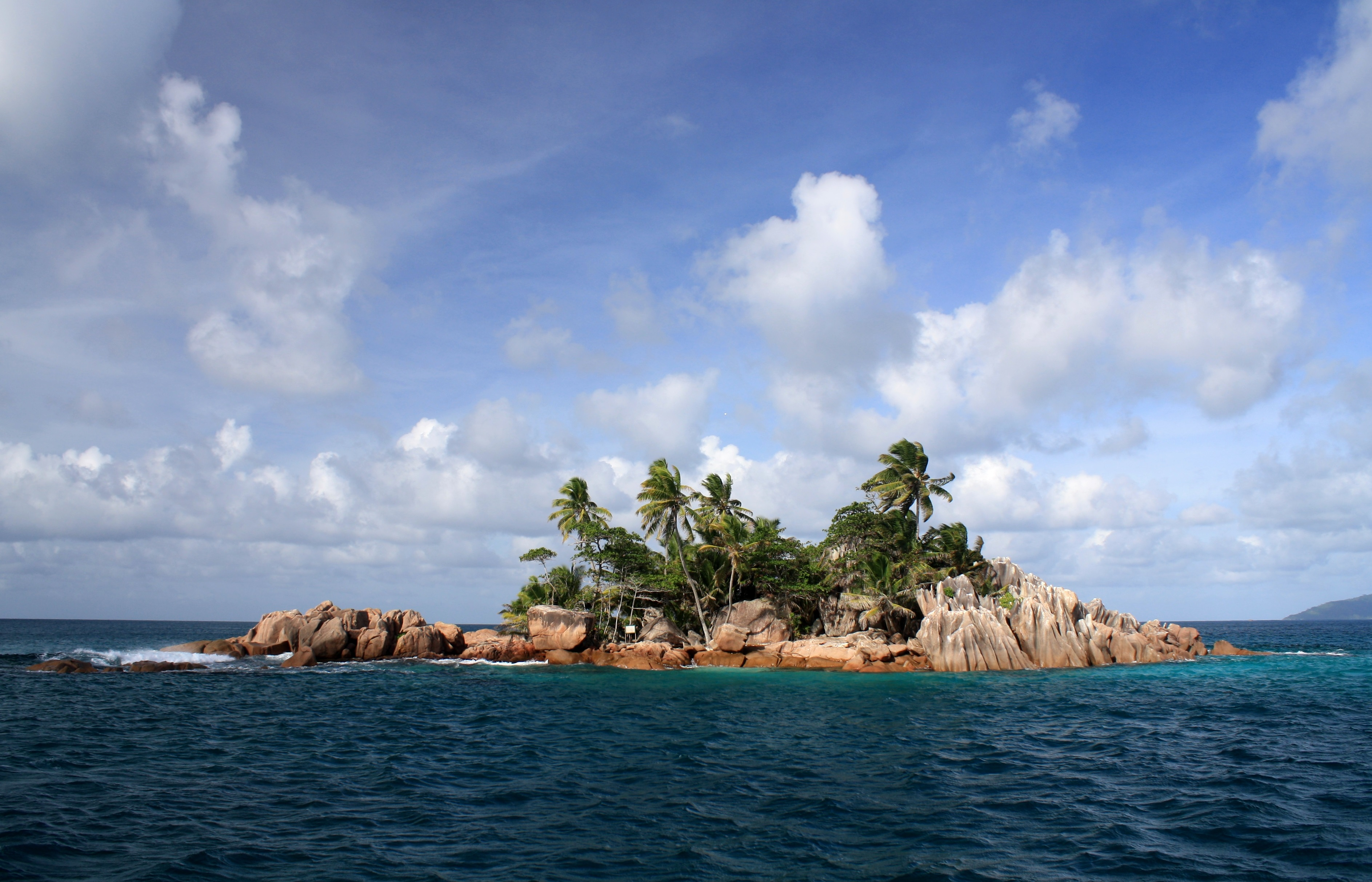

- Map of Praslin, Ile St. Pierre is to the north of Praslin

- Location within Seychelles

Geography
- Location: Seychelles, Indian Ocean
- Coordinates: 04.305°S 55.75°E
- Archipelago: Inner Islands, Seychelles
- Adjacent to: Indian Ocean
- Total islands: 1
- Major islands: St. Pierre
- Area: 0.01 km^{2} (0.0039 sq mi)
- Length: 0.1 km (0.06 mi)
- Width: 0.1 km (0.06 mi)
- Coastline: 0.33 km (0.205 mi)
- Highest elevation: 10 m (30 ft)

Administration
- Seychelles
- Group: Inner Islands
- Sub-Group: Granitic Seychelles
- Sub-Group: Praslin Islands
- Districts: Baie Sainte Anne

Demographics
- Population: 0 (2014)
- Pop. density: 0/km^{2} (0/sq mi)
- Ethnic groups: Creole, French, East Africans, Indians.

Additional information
- Time zone: SCT (UTC+4)
- ISO code: SC-07
- Official website: www.seychelles.travel/en/discover/the-islands/

Ile St. Pierre is an uninhabited island of the Seychelles. It is located north of the island of Praslin in the east of Curieuse Island on the edge of the Curieuse Marine National Park. The distance from the island to Pointe Zanguilles on Praslin is 1.5 km. The waters around Île St. Pierre are a firm favourite with swimmers, snorkellers and yachtsmen for whom the island provides the ideal backdrop to a spectacular Seychelles sunset. One of several islands in the bay of Côte d'Or on Praslin, this tiny islet with its granite profile interspersed with some coconut palms has come, over the years, to represent the quintessential Seychelles island, appearing in numerous advertisement campaigns, posters and evocative photographs. The seventh episode of the American reality show The Amazing Race 16 filmed off its shores.

== Geography ==
The island is rocky, with some Coconut trees, and previously had Lodoicea trees.

== Image gallery ==
Map 1
