= Massiges =

- Commune
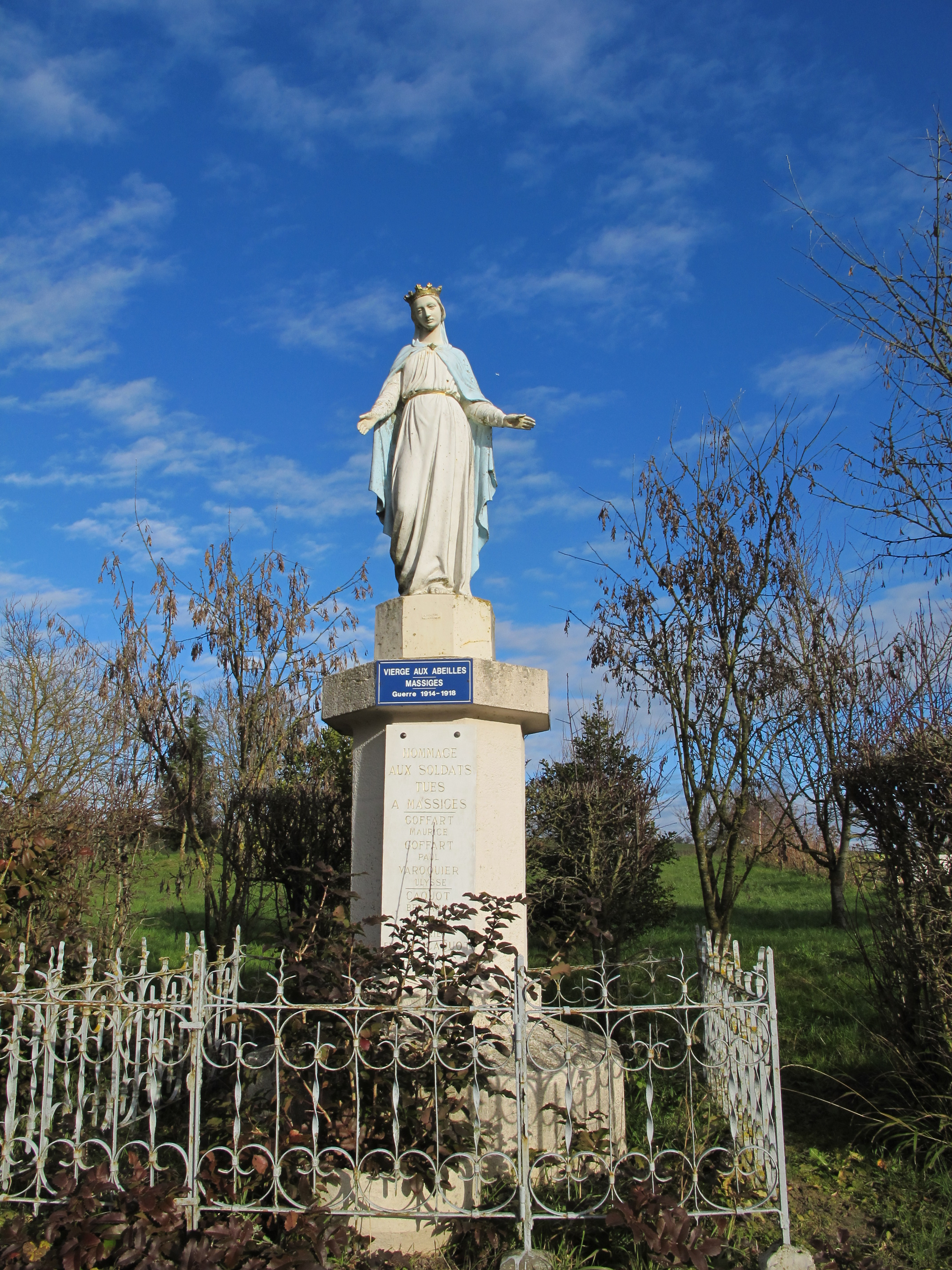
- A statue of the Virgin in Massiges
- Location of Massiges
- Location within France Location within Grand Est
- Coordinates: 49°11′16″N 4°45′03″E
- Country: France
- Region: Grand Est
- Department: Marne
- Arrondissement: Châlons-en-Champagne
- Canton: Argonne Suippe et Vesle
- Intercommunality: Argonne Champenoise

Government
  - Mayor (2020–2026): Pierre Labat
- Area^{1}: 8.19 km^{2} (3.16 sq mi)
- Elevation: 133 m (436 ft)
- Highest elevation: 198 m (650 ft)
- Lowest elevation: 124 m (407 ft)
- Population (2023): 43
  - Density: 5.3/km^{2} (14/sq mi)
- Time zone: UTC+01:00 (CET)
  - Summer (DST): UTC+02:00 (CEST)
- INSEE/Postal code: 51355 /51800
- ^{1} French Land Register data, which excludes lakes, ponds, glaciers > 1 km^{2} (0.386 sq mi or 247 acres) and river estuaries.

Massiges (French pronunciation: [masiʒ]) is a commune in the Marne department in north-eastern France.

The neighbouring Main de Massiges, an elevated geographical feature shaped like a left hand, was the site of considerable fighting during the First World War.

== See also ==
- Communes of the Marne department
