= Mega Adventure Park =

Amusement park on Sentosa Island, Singapore

Coordinates: 1°15′23.15″N 103°48′55.91″E

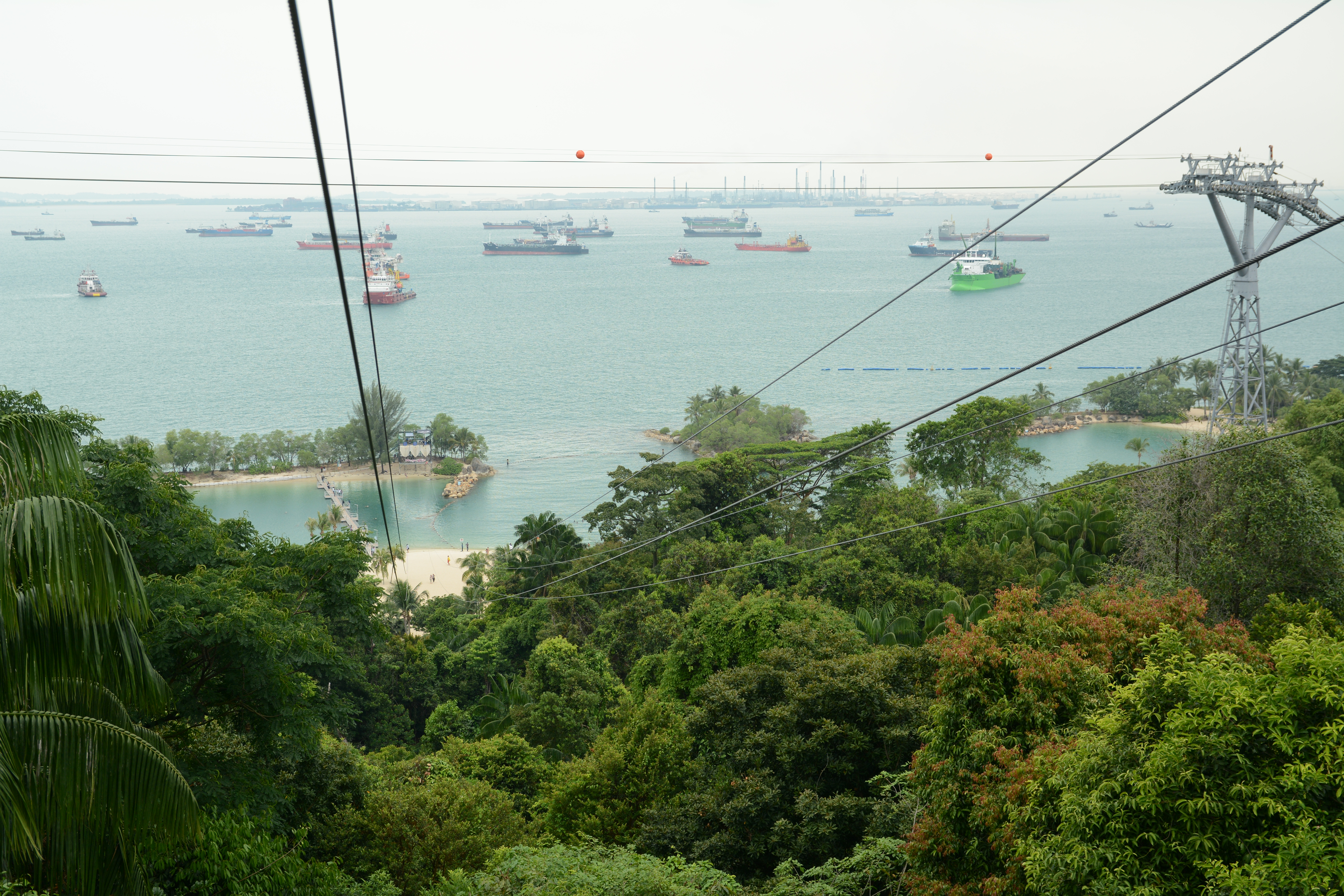
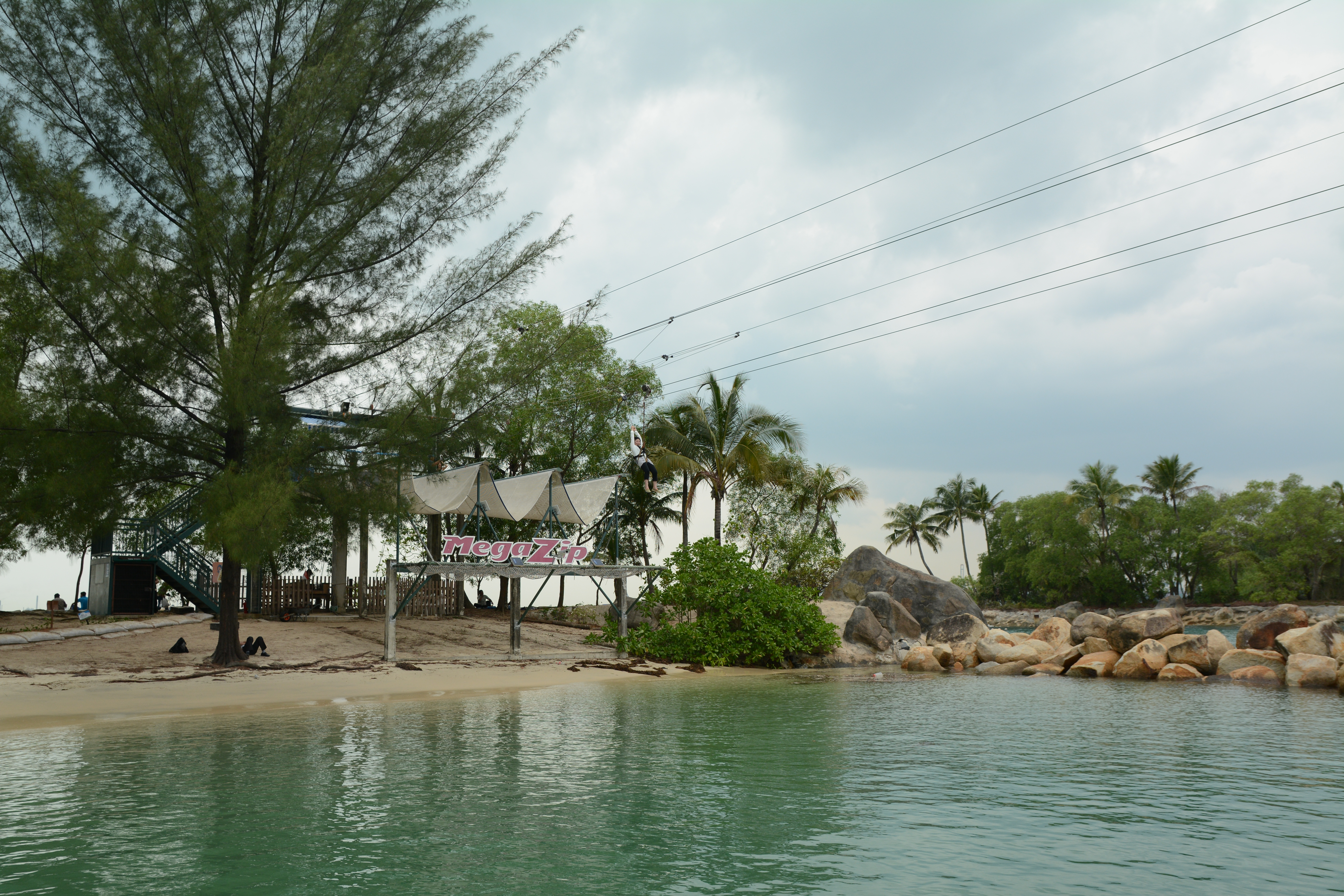
The start and end points of the zip line in the Mega Adventure Park in Sentosa, Singapore

Mega Adventure Park - Singapore is located on the Sentosa Island, home to several of Singapore's main attractions. The park features the MegaZip flying fox, which spans 450m, flies at 60 km/hour, passing over the island's jungles and beaches. The park also includes a 36-obstacle treetop ropes course (MegaClimb), a 15-meter free fall simulator (MegaJump), and bungee-assisted trampolines (MegaBounce).

== Attractions ==
=== MegaZip ===
The main attraction is a 450-metre (1,480 ft) zip-line which takes participants from the peak of Imbiah Hill, 75 metres (246 ft) above ground level and at a speed of up to 60 kilometres per hour (37 mph), across a jungle, a beach, the sea, and ending on a man-made island off Siloso Beach. Participants are connected to the zip-line by a customized "zipper" that rolls them down the line from the start to the end.

=== MegaClimb ===
MegaClimb is an obstacle course consisting of three levels of aerial ropes installed around eucalyptus trees 15 metres (49 ft) high. Participants are provided with full-body harnesses and are connected to continuous belaying systems. The course has 12 obstacles per level, and includes confidence gaps, horizontal ladders and mini flying foxes.

=== MegaJump ===
MegaJump is a simulated parachute jump. The sensation of a free fall can be experienced by jumping off the tower which is connected to a power fan descender that ensures a soft and safe landing.

=== MegaBounce ===
MegaBounce is based on a simple trampoline with the added feature of a system of elastic bands that allows participants to make higher-than-normal jumps safely – they can "bounce" up to 10 metres (33 ft) into the air.
