= Yoda Fountain =

Fountain in San Francisco, California, U.S.

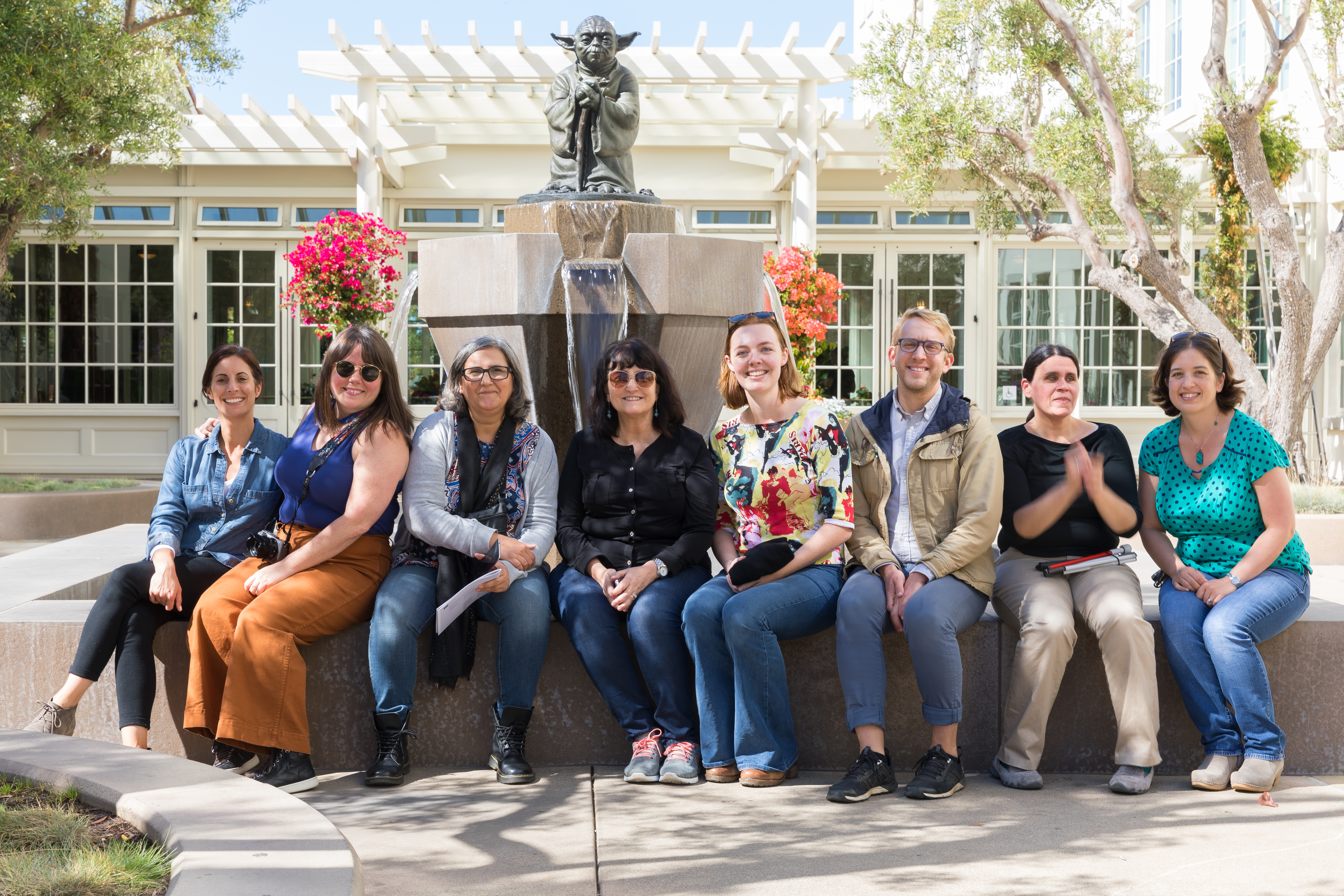
- Location: San Francisco, California, U.S.; 37°47′55.8″N 122°27′1.8″W

Yoda Fountain is a fountain with a bronze statue of the Star Wars character Yoda, installed in front of the Industrial Light & Magic offices in the Letterman Digital Arts Center in San Francisco, California, United States. The full-size replica was unveiled in 2005 and has since become a tourist destination and meetup location for many fans.

== Adjacent Star Wars attractions ==
Visitors can also go inside the lobby of the offices behind the statue to see and take pictures with some memorabilia. Starting in 2026, there is also a General Store around the corner selling Star Wars products and merchandise as well as wine and food items from Skywalker Ranch.
