= Les Monthairons =

- Commune
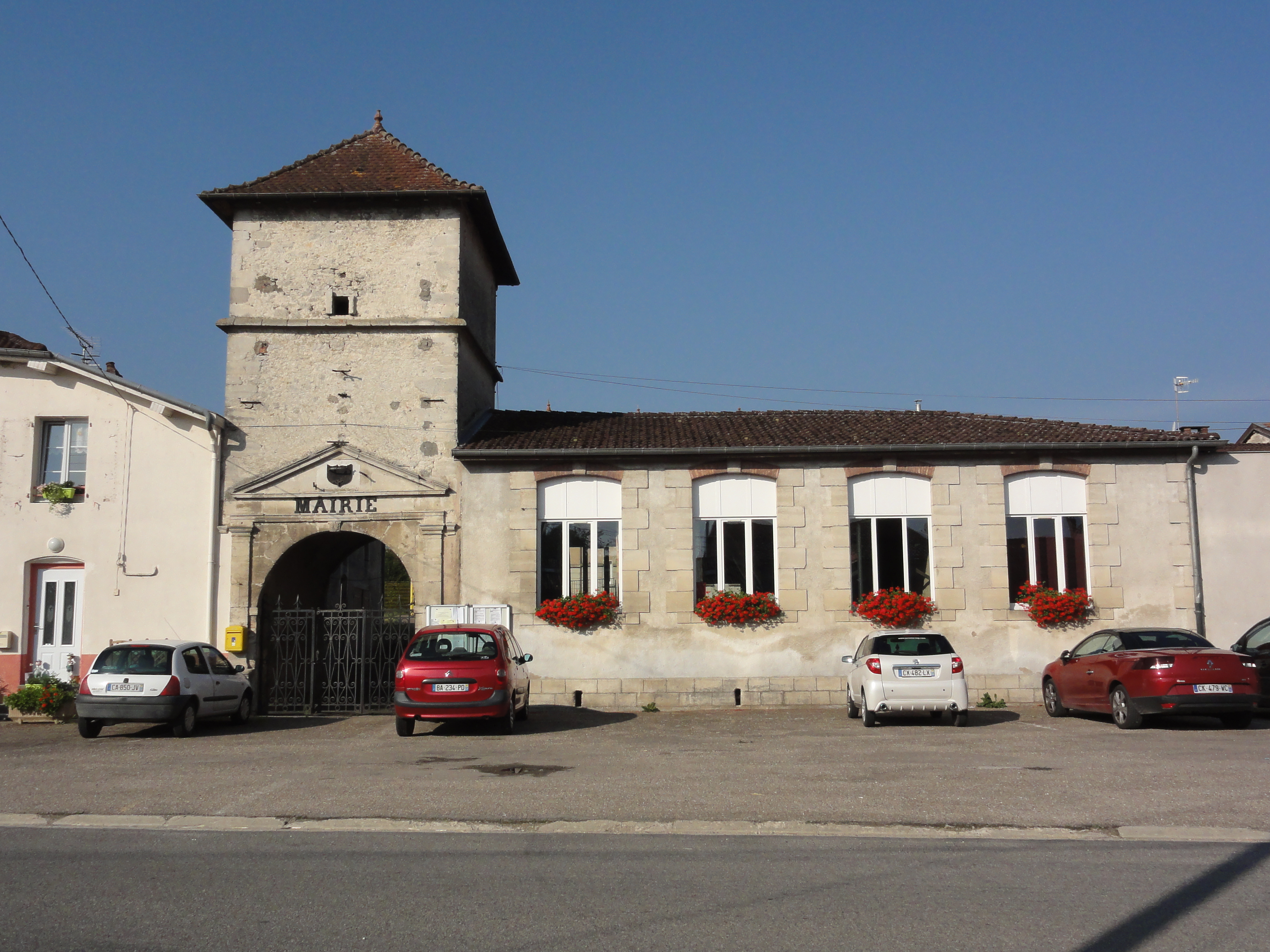
- The town hall in Les Monthairons
- Location of Les Monthairons
- Location within France Location within Grand Est
- Coordinates: 49°03′02″N 5°24′42″E
- Country: France
- Region: Grand Est
- Department: Meuse
- Arrondissement: Verdun
- Canton: Dieue-sur-Meuse
- Intercommunality: Val de Meuse - Voie Sacrée

Government
  - Mayor (2020–2026): Laëtitia Hurlain
- Area^{1}: 12.22 km^{2} (4.72 sq mi)
- Elevation: 212 m (696 ft)
- Highest elevation: 319 m (1,047 ft)
- Lowest elevation: 201 m (659 ft)
- Population (2023): 324
  - Density: 26.5/km^{2} (68.7/sq mi)
- Time zone: UTC+01:00 (CET)
  - Summer (DST): UTC+02:00 (CEST)
- INSEE/Postal code: 55347 /55320
- ^{1} French Land Register data, which excludes lakes, ponds, glaciers > 1 km^{2} (0.386 sq mi or 247 acres) and river estuaries.

Les Monthairons (French pronunciation: [le mɔ̃teʁɔ̃]) is a commune in the Meuse department in Grand Est in north-eastern France.

== See also ==
- Communes of the Meuse department
