= Wargemoulin-Hurlus =

- Commune
- Location of Wargemoulin-Hurlus
- Location within France Location within Grand Est
- Coordinates: 49°09′25″N 4°41′59″E
- Country: France
- Region: Grand Est
- Department: Marne
- Arrondissement: Châlons-en-Champagne
- Canton: Argonne Suippe et Vesle
- Intercommunality: Argonne Champenoise

Government
  - Mayor (2020–2026): Daniel Janson
- Area^{1}: 15.17 km^{2} (5.86 sq mi)
- Elevation: 150 m (490 ft)
- Population (2023): 45
  - Density: 3.0/km^{2} (7.7/sq mi)
- Time zone: UTC+01:00 (CET)
  - Summer (DST): UTC+02:00 (CEST)
- INSEE/Postal code: 51659 /51800
- ^{1} French Land Register data, which excludes lakes, ponds, glaciers > 1 km^{2} (0.386 sq mi or 247 acres) and river estuaries.

Wargemoulin-Hurlus is a commune in the Marne department in north-eastern France.

== Population ==
Historical population
Year	Pop.	±% p.a.
1968	55	—
1975	47	−2.22%
1982	45	−0.62%
1990	48	+0.81%
1999	43	−1.21%
2007	49	+1.65%
2012	47	−0.83%
2017	46	−0.43%
2023	45	−0.37%
Source: INSEE

== See also ==
- Communes of the Marne department
