= Vista Hermosa Natural Park =

Park in Los Angeles, California

- Interactive map of Vista Hermosa Natural Park
- Location: Echo Park, Los Angeles, California
- Coordinates: 34°03′42″N 118°15′25″W
- Area: 10.5-acre (42,000 m^{2})
- Created: July 19, 2008; 17 years ago
- Operator: Mountains Recreation and Conservation Authority
- Status: open

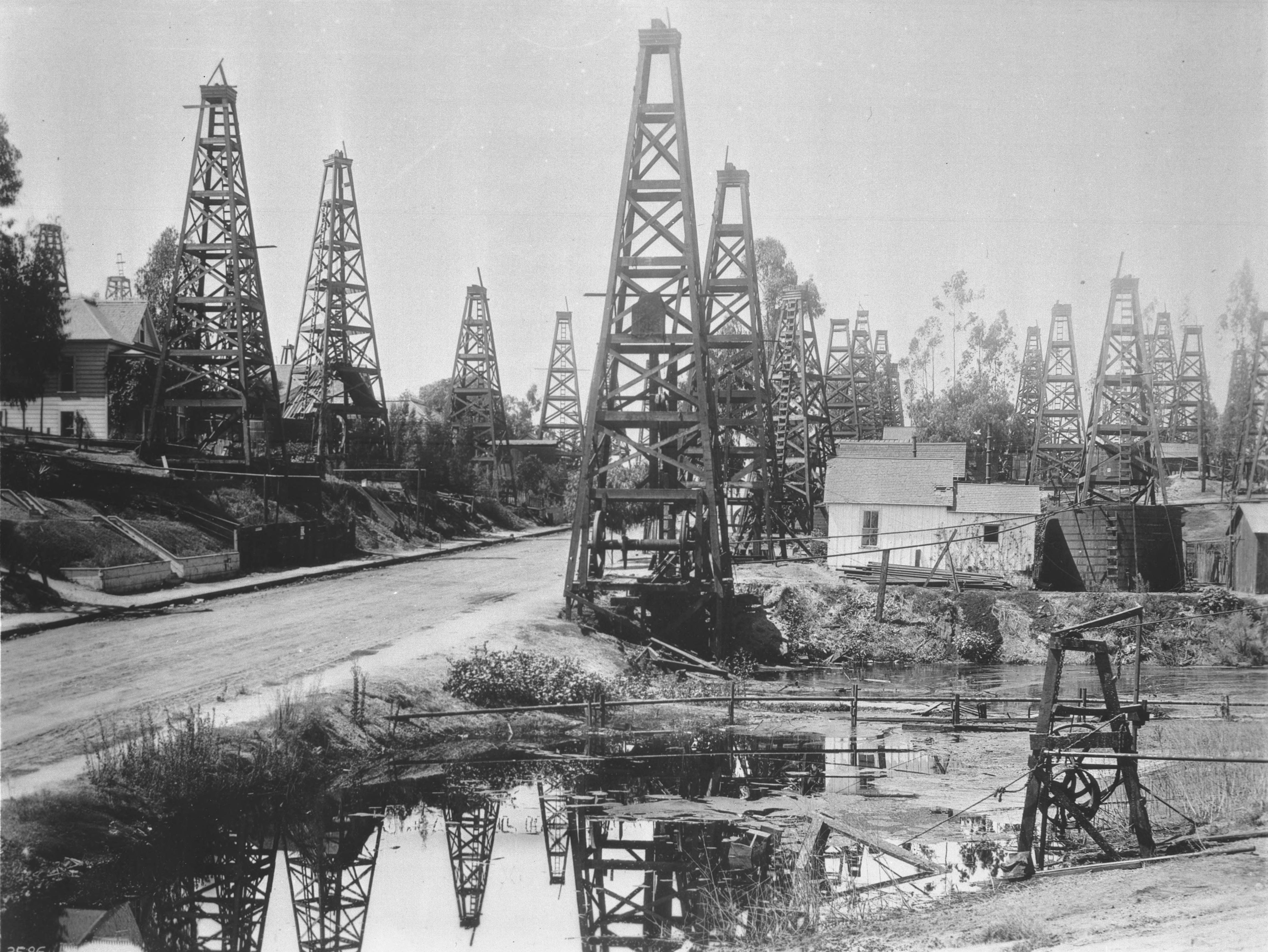
Toluca Street Oil Field in Los Angeles oil district, c. 1895–1901

The Vista Hermosa Natural Park is an urban public park located in Echo Park, Los Angeles, immediately west of Civic Center, Los Angeles. Vista Hermosa Natural Park sits on a former oil field of 10.5 acres (4.2 ha), bounded by Toluca Street and West 1st Street, Los Angeles. During construction, the polluted topsoil was removed and replaced, and a ventilation system was installed to control the flow of dangerous gases. The park includes walking trails, streams, meadows, oak savannahs, picnic grounds, a nature-themed playground, and a soccer field.

The $15-million park was opened on July 19, 2008 and was the first to open in Downtown Los Angeles in over 100 years. The park is managed as a partnership among the Los Angeles Unified School District, the City of Los Angeles, and the Mountains Recreation and Conservation Authority (MRCA). In 2023, the American Society of Landscape Architects gave the park The Landmark Award, praising it for providing recreational space to a working-class neighborhood generally lacking in parks.

== See also ==
- Echo Park, Los Angeles
- List of parks in Los Angeles
