= Artillería funicular railway =

National monument of Chile, closed in 2021

Coordinates: 33°02′00″S 71°37′49″W

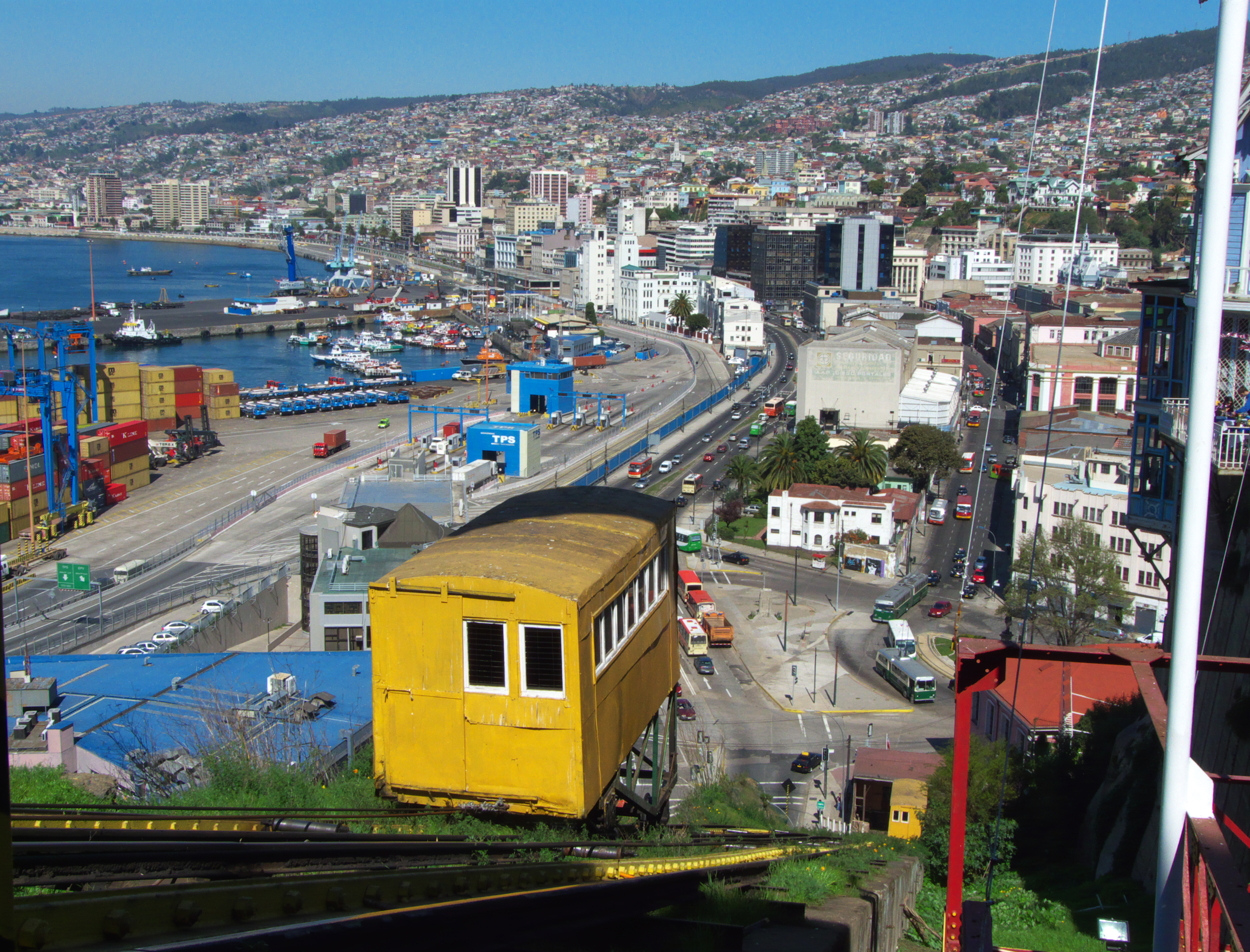
Artillería funicular railway in the year 2009.

The Ascensor Artillería is one of the 16 funicular railways located in the Chilean city of Valparaíso. It links the "plan" (flat area) of the city with the Artillería hill, and is privately owned. The line ran all year, and was one of the most popular; however, it closed in May 2021.

== History ==
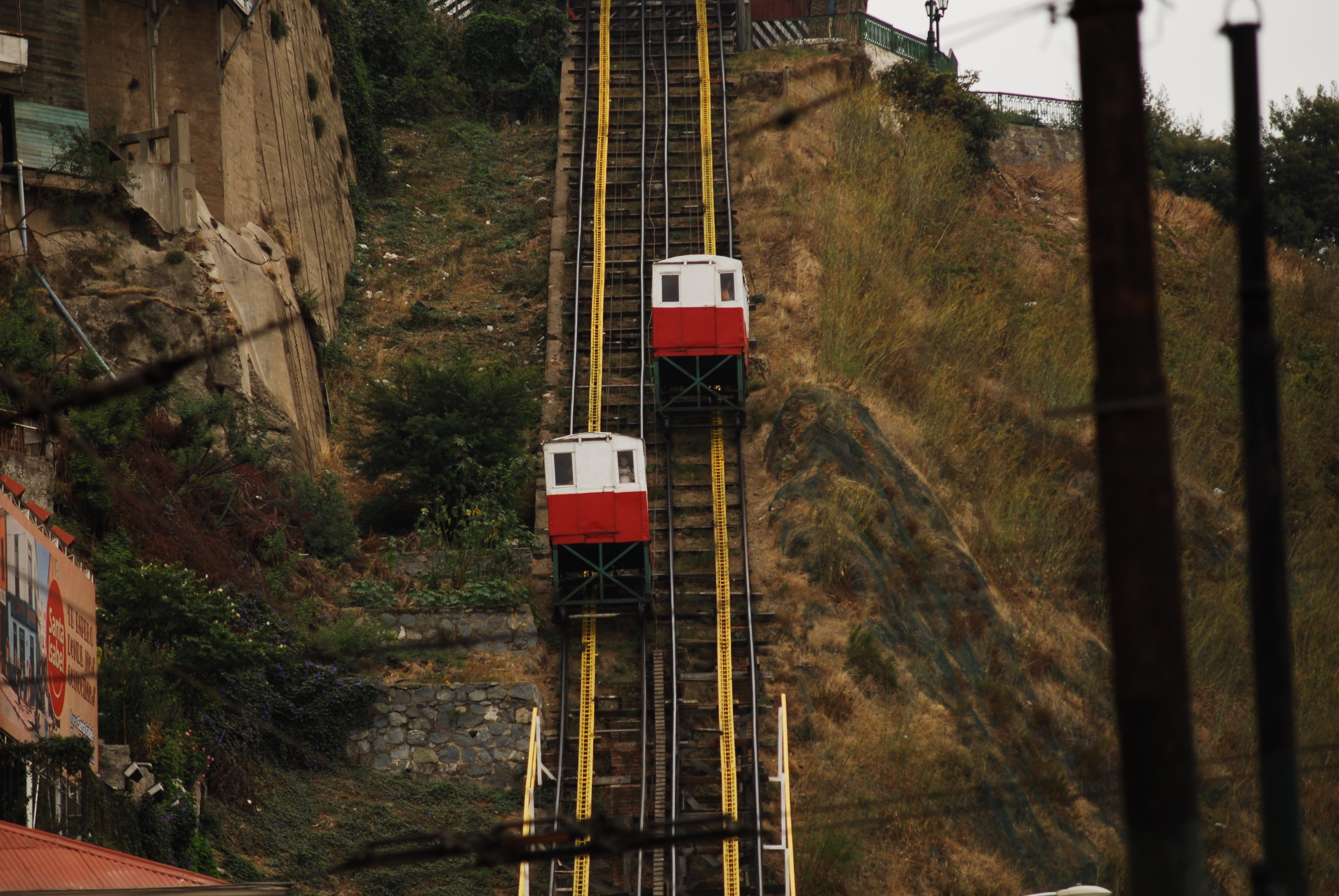
Artillería funicular railway in 2007, to the left was the original line.

This was the third funicular railway built in the city of Valparaíso. It was inaugurated on 29 December 1892, but didn't enter service until 22 of January 1893, due to a lack of water to run the machinery.

It was so successful that its designer Ernesto Onfray built another adjacent to it in 1908, making it the only funicular in the city with four tracks and two independent machine rooms.

In 1968 the first line of the funicular ceased operation due to low ridership.

Today the funicular uses the second line, and is a major landmark.

== Specifications ==
- Two cars have traditional funicular design, with a capacity of 25 passengers
- Drive equipment located at the top station
- The trip takes 80 seconds
- 175-meter (574 ft) track
- Hoisting ropes attached to upper ends of car chassis
- Fares are paid at the top station

== See also ==
- Funicular railway
- Funicular railways of Valparaíso
- List of funicular railways
- Valparaíso
