= Ñirihuau =

Coordinates: 41°07′S 71°09′W

- Municipality and village
- Interactive map of Ñirihuau
- Country: Argentina
- Province: Río Negro Province
- Department: Pilcaniyeu
- Elevation: 2,306 ft (703 m)

Population (2001 INDEC)
  - Total: 125
- Time zone: UTC−3 (ART)
- Postcode: R8400
- Area code: 02940

Ñirihuau is a village and municipality in Río Negro Province in Argentina.
