= Arrondissement of Sainte-Menehould =

Coordinates: 49.08°N 4.90°E

Sainte-Menehould
- Former arrondissement
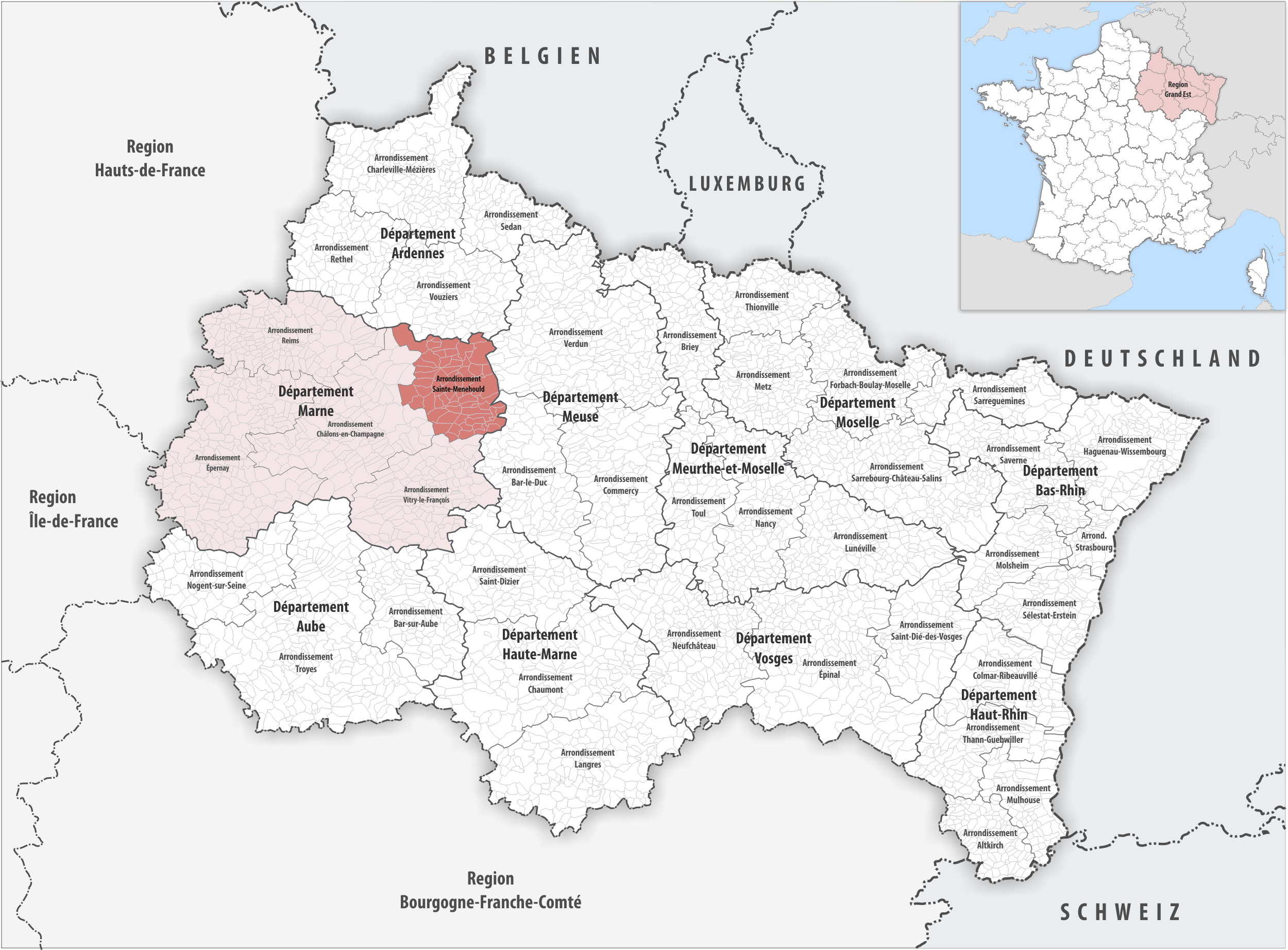
- Location within the region Grand Est
- Country: France
- Region: Grand Est
- Department: Marne
- No. of communes: {{{nbcomm}}}
- Disbanded: 2017
- Area: 1,021 km^{2} (394 sq mi)
- Population (2012): 13,927
  - Density: 13.64/km^{2} (35.33/sq mi)

The arrondissement of Sainte-Menehould is a former arrondissement of France in the Marne department in the Grand Est region. It was disbanded at the April 2017 reorganisation of the arrondissements of Marne. It had 67 communes, and its population was 13,927 (2012).

== Composition ==
The communes of the arrondissement of Sainte-Menehould, and their INSEE codes, were:

| 1. Argers (51015) | 2. Auve (51027) | 3. Belval-en-Argonne (51047) |
| 4. Berzieux (51053) | 5. Binarville (51062) | 6. Braux-Saint-Remy (51083) |
| 7. Braux-Sainte-Cohière (51082) | 8. Cernay-en-Dormois (51104) | 9. Chaudefontaine (51139) |
| 10. Châtrices (51138) | 11. Contault (51166) | 12. Courtémont (51191) |
| 13. Dampierre-le-Château (51206) | 14. Dommartin-Dampierre (51211) | 15. Dommartin-Varimont (51214) |
| 16. Dommartin-sous-Hans (51213) | 17. Florent-en-Argonne (51253) | 18. Fontaine-en-Dormois (51255) |
| 19. Givry-en-Argonne (51272) | 20. Gizaucourt (51274) | 21. Gratreuil (51280) |
| 22. Hans (51283) | 23. Herpont (51292) | 24. La Chapelle-Felcourt (51126) |
| 25. La Croix-en-Champagne (51197) | 26. La Neuville-au-Pont (51399) | 27. La Neuville-aux-Bois (51397) |
| 28. Laval-sur-Tourbe (51317) | 29. Le Chemin (51143) | 30. Le Châtelier (51133) |
| 31. Le Vieil-Dampierre (51619) | 32. Les Charmontois (51132) | 33. Maffrécourt (51336) |
| 34. Malmy (51341) | 35. Massiges (51355) | 36. Minaucourt-le-Mesnil-lès-Hurlus (51368) |
| 37. Moiremont (51370) | 38. Noirlieu (51404) | 39. Passavant-en-Argonne (51424) |
| 40. Rapsécourt (51452) | 41. Remicourt (51456) | 42. Rouvroy-Ripont (51470) |
| 43. Saint-Jean-sur-Tourbe (51491) | 44. Saint-Mard-sur-Auve (51498) | 45. Saint-Mard-sur-le-Mont (51500) |
| 46. Saint-Remy-sur-Bussy (51515) | 47. Saint-Thomas-en-Argonne (51519) | 48. Sainte-Menehould (51507) |
| 49. Servon-Melzicourt (51533) | 50. Sivry-Ante (51537) | 51. Somme-Bionne (51543) |
| 52. Somme-Tourbe (51547) | 53. Somme-Yèvre (51549) | 54. Sommepy-Tahure (51544) |
| 55. Tilloy-et-Bellay (51572) | 56. Valmy (51588) | 57. Verrières (51610) |
| 58. Vienne-la-Ville (51620) | 59. Vienne-le-Château (51621) | 60. Ville-sur-Tourbe (51640) |
| 61. Villers-en-Argonne (51632) | 62. Virginy (51646) | 63. Voilemont (51650) |
| 64. Wargemoulin-Hurlus (51659) | 65. Éclaires (51222) | 66. Élise-Daucourt (51228) |
| 67. Épense (51229) | | |

== History ==
The arrondissement of Sainte-Menehould was created in 1800, disbanded in 1926 and restored in 1940. It was disbanded again in April 2017, and its communes joined the arrondissement of Châlons-en-Champagne. As a result of the reorganisation of the cantons of France which came into effect in 2015, the borders of the cantons are no longer related to the borders of the arrondissements. The cantons of the arrondissement of Sainte-Menehould were, as of January 2015:

- Givry-en-Argonne
- Sainte-Menehould
- Ville-sur-Tourbe
