= Renard II of Dampierre-en-Astenois =

13th-century French nobleman

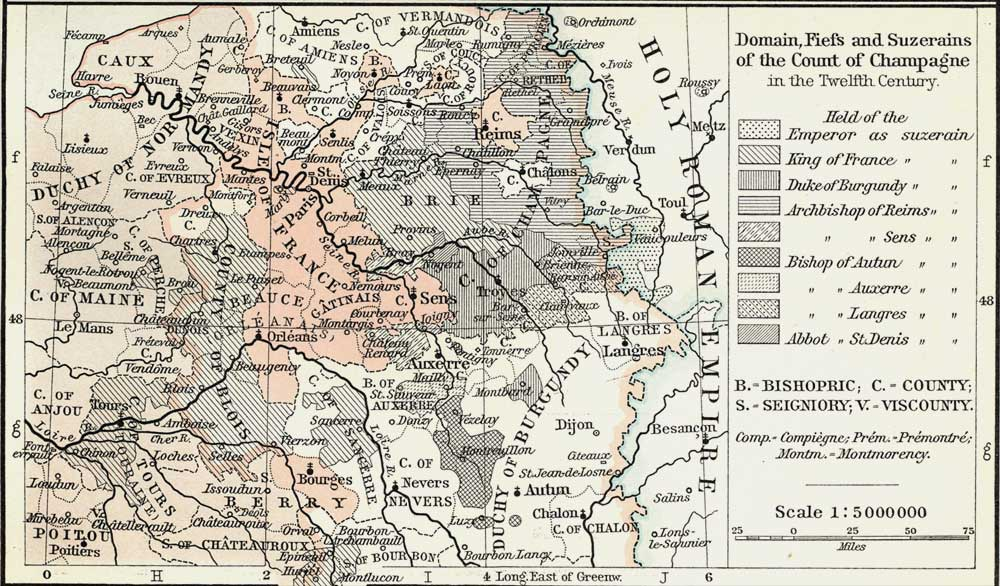
The County of Champagne in the 12th century. Dampierre-le-Château was located midway between Châlons and Verdun on the border between France and the Holy Roman Empire.

Renard II, also spelled Reynald, Raynald, Rainard or Renaud (Note: The Old French manuscripts of Geoffrey of Villehardouin's history of the Fourth Crusade spell his names in various ways: Reinars, Reinarz, Reignarz, Renart, Renaut or Renaus.) (1170s – 1234), was the count or lord of Dampierre-le-Château in the Astenois. His lordship lay partly within the Holy Roman Empire, but he was also a direct vassal of the count of Champagne in the Kingdom of France.

Renard took part in the Fourth Crusade, but did not join the siege of Constantinople. He was captured in the Holy Land by the emir of Aleppo and remained in prison for twenty-eight years until he was ransomed.

== Family and church ==
Renard was a son of Renard I (died 1190 or 1191) and Euphemia (married by 1163). He married Helvide (or Héloïse) shortly after the death of her first husband, Henry, (Note: Henry was a younger brother of Manasses IV, Count of Rethel.) castellan of Vitry, in 1190. She bore the title castellana, while Renard administered the castellany on behalf of her young son Hugh. In 1191, Renard, bearing the titles count of Dampierre and castellan of Vitry, made a donation to the Templars of Vitry. He continued to administer Vitry on behalf of Hugh until the latter's early death in 1203. Helvide and Renard had two sons: Renard III and Anselm I. They were born before 1192, when they are mentioned in a document alongside Renard and his brother Henry. All four are mentioned together again in 1193 and 1196. Helvide died after ten years of marriage in 1200.

The same year as his wife died, Renard took the cross, vowing to go on the Fourth Crusade. Several documents from 1200–02 allude to this vow. He made gifts to the hospital of Châlons and to the abbeys of La Chalade and Monthiers-en-Argonne. In early 1202 he approval to the purchase by Monthiers of all the lands of the abbey of Saint-Martin-des-Champs in exchange for the right to half of it on the condition of payment of an annual census to the monks of Monthiers. This agreement never came into force, as Monthiers did not acquire lands from Saint-Martin.

== Crusade and imprisonment ==
Renard left on crusade in 1202. The second edition of the Feoda Campanie, (Note: A register of all the fiefs of the County of Champagne, first drawn up in 1178.) written around this time contains a note beside his name that reads "who is overseas" (qui est ultra mare). He had a following of 84 knights when he joined the army of his suzerain, Count Theobald III of Champagne. Theobald died suddenly in May 1201, without making it to the crusade muster at Venice. As a result, Renard departed from the main crusader force near Piacenza in Italy in the summer of 1202 and did not go on to Venice or take part in the sack of Constantinople. Instead, he and a small group of crusaders (Note: Among them were Villain de Nully, Henri d'Arzillières, Henry de Longchamp and Gilles II de Trazegnies.) went south to Apulia and there took ship to Acre, the capital of the Kingdom of Jerusalem, to fulfill their vows to go to the Holy Land. Simon IV de Montfort and Abbot Adam of Perseigne abandoned the crusade at Zara, crossed to Italy, and joined Renard and the others who were leaving for the Holy Land, probably at Brindisi.

There are conflicting reports about why Renard broke from the main army. Alberic of Trois-Fontaines, writing a few decades later, claims that on his deathbed Theobald had asked Renard to fulfill his vow by going to the Holy Land as his substitute and offered him a large amount of silver for his expenses. Renard then swore to fulfill Theobald's vow. Alberic says Renard did not leave the army until the siege of Zara and then went first to Rome, but this is definitely incorrect. Geoffrey of Villehardouin, a member of the crusade who wrote a history of it, De la Conquête de Constantinople, implies that Renard was an oath-breaker when he refused to appear at Venice for the general muster. Villehardouin says that Theobald had made all his followers swear an oath to meet at Venice as planned, adding that "many there were who kept that oath badly, and so incurred great blame." (Note: Old French: mult i ot de cels qui malvaisement le tindrent et mult en furent blasmé. The translation is from Frank T. Marzials, Memoirs or Chronicle of the Fourth Crusade and the Conquest of Constantinople (London: J. M. Dent, 1908).)

In the Holy Land, Renard first tried to persuade King Aimery of Jerusalem to break his truce with Al-Adil I, Ayyubid sultan of Egypt, but the king refused. Renard had 300 soldiers with him, as well as Count Theobald's money, when he arrived in the Holy Land. According to the chronicler Ernoul, the king rebuked the notion of fighting Egypt with a mere 300 men. Unable to fulfill his and his lord's vow to fight the infidel, he entered the service of Prince Bohemond IV of Antioch. On 16 May 1203, he was with a force of about 80 knights that was ambushed near the village of Baarin by the forces of Az-Zahir Ghazi, Ayyubid emir of Aleppo. They had ignored advice from locals not to force a passage. Only one crusader managed to escape, while all the rest were either killed or, like Renard, captured. (Note: Villain de Nully was among those killed. Among the captives were his brother, Guillaume de Nully; Jean de Villers; and Bernard de Moreuil.) He was imprisoned in Aleppo for twenty-eight years until finally ransomed by or with the help of the Knights Hospitaller in 1231.

== Absence and return ==
During Renard's long imprisonment, his lands came under the government of his eldest son, Renard III. He died around 1230, and was succeeded by his younger brother Anselm. Renard II had returned to Astenois by early 1233. On 2 March, (Note: The charter actually reads 1232, but it is usually corrected to 1233.) he founded a Hospitaller commandery at Autrecourt (Hautecour, now in Épense) by giving the order a house he owned there. This commandery was later united with that of Saint-Amand. In June, he gave another charter, noting that he was recently "returned from parts overseas" (rediens a partibus transmarinis). This charter was probably aimed at raising money to repay the Hospitallers for his ransom.

Renard's sons had alienated many of his lands, and the abbey of Monthiers-en-Argonne had usurped others. Renard successfully recovered some of his properties and received a large compensation for the others. He took his case against Monthiers-en-Argonne before the marshal of Champagne, Geoffroy de Louppy, who ordered the monks to pay an indemnity. He also brought suit against the monastery in the court of Philip II, bishop of Châlons, claiming 1500 livres in lost revenue over thirty years. After the monks countersued over damages Renard committed in the woods of Tilloy, both sides settled and agreed to drop their suits. Renard subsequently drew up a charter detailing his claims and the settlements reached to all of them:

I, Renard, lord of Dampierre, wish all present and future to know that when I returned from overseas, I became involved in many disputes with the abbot and monks of Monthiers-en-Argonne over property which I claimed that they took from me while I was detained overseas. . . So that neither I nor my heirs will ever trouble the monks again, and so that this settlement remain in perpetuity, I and my heirs [my dear and only son Anselm] have agreed to all that is contained in this charter. I have corroborated this charter by my seal. Done in the year of grace 1233.

In March 1234, Renard made a gift to the leprosarium of Saint-Jacques de Châlons while he was ill and on the verge of death (laborans in extremis). In April 1234, he wrote a letter to Count Theobald IV explaining that on account of his illness he cannot appear in person to request Theobald to ratify a donation his late son had made in his absence. Renard III had granted the tithes and fairs of Le Vieil-Dampierre to the abbey of Chatrices. By July he was dead and was succeeded by Anselm.
