= Renard III of Dampierre-en-Astenois =

Renard III, also spelled Reynald, Raynald, Rainard or Renaud (died c. 1230), was the acting lord (or count) of Dampierre-en-Astenois from 1202 until his death. He ruled the lordship during his father's absence on the Fourth Crusade and his long captivity. Renard died before his father and never succeeded to the lordship in full.

Renard was the eldest son of Renard II and Helvide. He and his brother Anselm were both born before 1192, when they are mentioned in a document for the first time. They are also mentioned in documents of 1193 and 1196. Renard II left on crusade in 1202, was captured and did not return to Astenois until 1233.

In 1207 and in May 1218, Renard, as acting suzerain, confirmed two donations made by his uncle Henry. Renard himself many several grants, always respecting his father's right to confirm or revoke them if and when he returned from captivity overseas. The grant of the tithes and revenues from the fairs of Le Vieil-Dampierre to the abbey of Chatrices was confirmed by his father and ratified by Count Theobald IV of Champagne, their suzerain, in 1234. In 1218, Renard III, calling himself "Jerusalem bound" (Hierosolimam profecturus), granted the tithes of Remicourt and the produce (terrage) of Sommeille to the abbey of Monthiers-en-Argonne, specifying that if his father did not approve these gifts, then the Countess Blanche, who confirmed the grant, could make good on the gift out of her own lands.

Renard's wife, Beatrice, lady of Til-Châtel, is first mentioned in a charter of 1221. In another charter that year, Renard used the title "count" for the first time. There is no surviving documentation between this and a charter of 1224. If Renard did go on his long-planned pilgrimage or crusade to the Holy Land, it should probably be dated to this interval. Renard's last known act is dated to 1230 and died not long after.

Renard had many children, but only one, Renard IV, is known by name. Although a minor, he succeeded to the acting lordship under the regency of his uncle Anselm, until the return of Renard II in 1233. Renard IV seems to have died before his grandfather, who was thus succeeded by Anselm in 1234. His widow, Beatrice, married Walter II, lord of Arzillières.

== Sources ==
- Barthélemy, Anatole de (1884). "Chartes de départ et de retour des comtes de Dampierre-en-Astenois: IV^{e} et V^{e} croisades". Archives de l'Orient Latin. 2: 184–207.
- Barthélemy, Anatole de (1889). "Le comté d'Astenois et les comtes de Dampierre-le-Château". Revue de Champagne et de Brie. Série 2. 1: 177–91.
- Longnon, Jean (1978). Les compagnons de Villehardouin: Recherches sur les croisés de la quatrième croisade. Geneva: Librairie Droz.
