= Renard I of Dampierre-en-Astenois =

Renard I, also spelled Reynald, Raynald, Rainard or Renaud (died 1190/1), was the lord or count of Dampierre-le-Château in the Astenois and a vassal of the count of Champagne. He succeeded his father Henry sometime between 1161 and 1163.

In 1163, Count Henry I of Champagne made himself a hostage of the German emperor Frederick I on behalf of his lord, King Louis VII of France. When Louis did not appear for a scheduled meeting, Henry was forced to do homage to Frederick for several castles, including Dampierre, that lay along the Franco-German border. This had the result of placing Renard's lordship in Germany, and the border thus ran through the county of Champagne. Afterwards, Louis VII claimed that Henry's cession had been unauthorised, but it was not reversed.

Also in 1163, Pope Alexander III issued a bull confirming the acquisitions of the monastery of Monthiers-en-Argonne. Included among them was the donation of Bouillemont (now part of Rapsécourt) by Guillaume de Sommièvre and his sons and daughters, which had been confirmed by Renard as Guillaume's lord. The pope refers to Renard as a count and not merely a lord. Renard also stood as surety for the priory of Saint-Martin-des-Champs when the prior donated a rent to the abbey of Monthiers.

Renard was married sometime before 1163 to one Euphemia, with whom he had two sons: Renard II, who succeeded him, and Henry. They also had a daughter named Marie.

In 1172, Renard appeared in the first edition of the Feoda Campaniae, a list of all the fiefs of the county of Champagne. He was listed as a liegeman in the castellany of Vitry.

== Sources ==
- Barthélemy, Anatole de (1888). "Le comté d'Astenois et les comtes de Dampierre-le-Château". Revue de Champagne et de Brie. 25: 401–16.
- Brouillon, Louis-Julien (1886). Les comtes de Dampierre-en-Astenois. Châlons.
- Evergates, Theodore, ed. (1993). Feudal Society in Medieval France: Documents from the County of Champagne. Philadelphia: University of Pennsylvania Press.
- Evergates, Theodore (2007). The Aristocracy in the County of Champagne, 1100–1300. Philadelphia: University of Pennsylvania Press.
- Evergates, Theodore (2016). Henry the Liberal: Count of Champagne, 1127–1181. Philadelphia: University of Pennsylvania Press.
- Longnon, Jean (1978). Les compagnons de Villehardouin: Recherches sur les croisés de la quatrième croisade. Geneva: Librairie Droz.
