= Dorfmeister =

The surname Dorfmeister means "village mayor" and may refer to:

- Gregor Dorfmeister (1929–2018), German author
- Johann Georg Dorfmeister (1736-1786), Austrian sculptor
- Karl Dorfmeister (1876-1955), Austrian architect
- Michaela Dorfmeister (born 1973), Austrian ski racer
- Stephan Dorfmeister (1729-1797), Austrian painter
- Richard Dorfmeister (born 1968), Austrian musician, part of Kruder & Dorfmeister
