= Three Fountains Abbey =

Three Fountains Abbey may refer to:

- Trois-Fontaines Abbey, in France
- Tre Fontane Abbey, in Italy
