= 1237 in France =

- Decades: 1210s; 1220s; 1230s; 1240s; 1250s
- See also: History of France; Timeline of French history; List of years in France

Events from the year 1237 in France

== Incumbents ==
- Monarch – Louis IX of France

== Events ==
- Louis IX grants Artois to his brother Robert.
- Henry III, Duke of Aquitane, orders the construction of a keep in Saint-Émilion
- Louis IX purchases a relic that is supposedly the crown of thorns from Baldwin II.
- Papal legate, Jean de Bernin executes a fugitive in Albi, Languedoc.

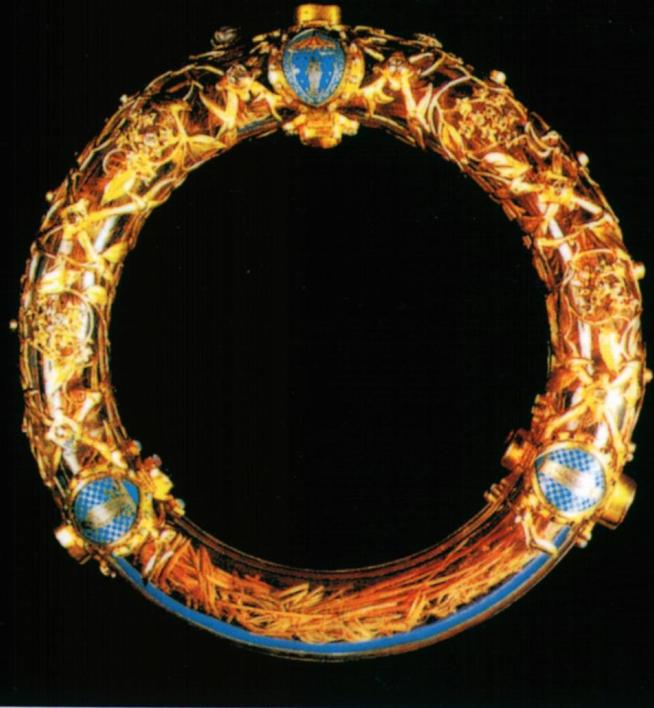
Purported Crown of Thorns purchased by Louis IX. On display in the Notre-Dame de Paris.

== Births ==
=== Date unknown ===
- Agnes of Dampierre, French noblewoman (d. 1288)
- Adam de la Halle, a French trouvère, poet, and musician (d. 1288)

== Deaths ==
- April 12 – Philip II de Méréville, French priest and bishop (Birth year unknown)
- Blacatz, Occitan troubadour (b. 1165)
- Helinand of Froidmont, poet and chronicler, (b. 1150)

=== Date unknown ===
- John Halgren of Abbeville, French philosopher and writer
