= Abbey of Monthiers-en-Argonne =

Abbey in Marne, France

Coordinates: 48.8994°N 4.8778°E

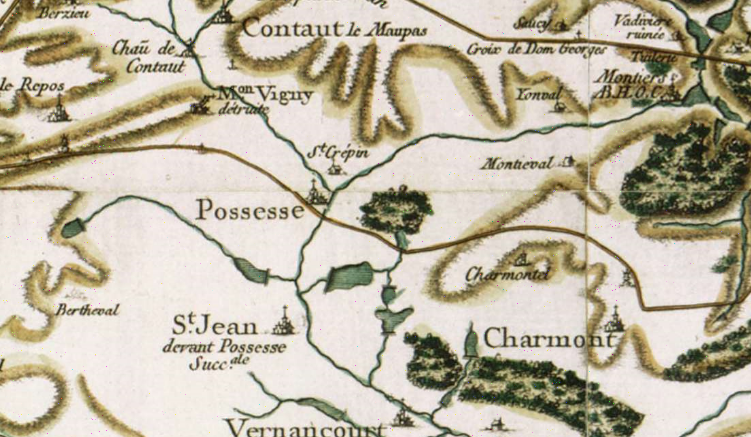
The abbey is in the top right corner of this map, on the edge of the forest of Argonne

The Abbey of Monthiers-en-Argonne (also spelled Montiers-en-Argonne, from Latin Monasterium in Argona, "monastery in the Argonne") was a Cistercian monastery located in Possesse in the diocese of Châlons-sur-Marne in the County of Champagne. A daughter house of Trois-Fontaines and of the lineage of Clairvaux, it was dedicated to Saints Nicholas and Mary (Notre-Dame). According to Leopold Janauschek, its order number was 194.

It was founded at the site called "Vieux Montiers" (Old Monastery) by its first abbot, Eustache, around 1135. Originally a house of Augustinian canons, it adopted the Cistercian rule on 30 May 1144. The monastery was moved to its final location, where its ruins are still found, around 1155. Eustache was assisted by a co-abbot, Gervais, and together they greatly expanded the abbey's temporalities. Towards the end of the century, the abbey was embroiled in controversy over land with the lords of Possesse and Dampierre-en-Astenois, especially Lord Renard II of Dampierre. Its abbot, Amadeus, was even deposed. It had lands and farms in Guidonval, La Basse-Cour, Rotonchamp, Valdivière, Le Saussy, Hurtebise, Bronne, Bouët and Outrivière in Noirlieu, Épensival in Épense, Lalieue in Remicourt, Notaval and Letemple.

During the French Revolution, in 1790 the monasteries were suppressed. Only the 18th-century convent and the pigeon house from 1650 still stand.
