= Szentgotthárd Abbey =

Coordinates: 46.9536°N 16.2731°E

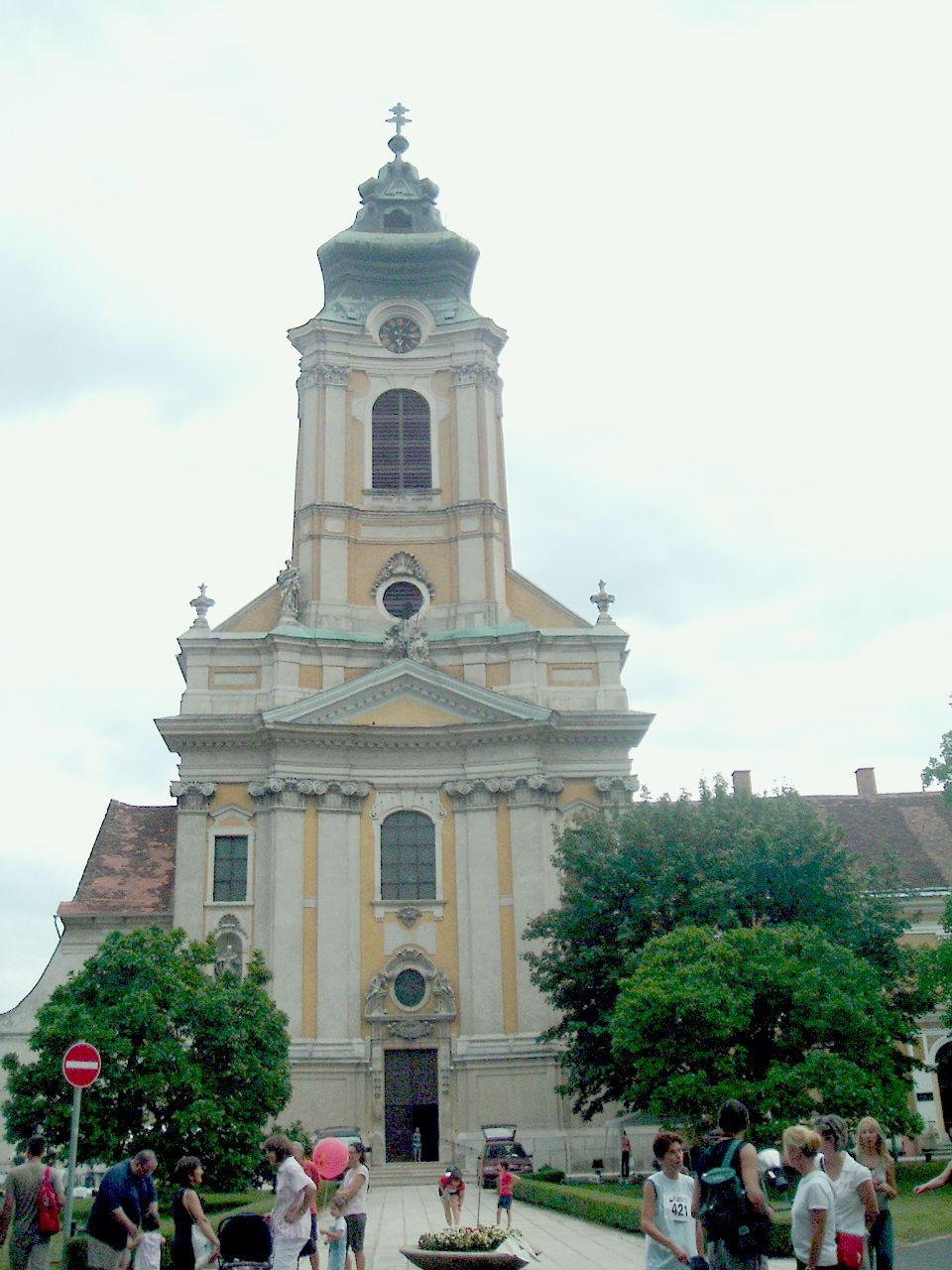
The Baroque abbey church

Szentgotthárd Abbey is a former Cistercian monastery and church in Szentgotthárd Hungary that is now a Roman Catholic parish church.

In Hungarian: Szentgotthárdi ciszterci apátság; German: Kloster Sankt Gotthard; Latin: Abbatia Sancti Gotthardi, Slovene: Monoštrska cistercijanska opatija, Prekmurje Slovene: Monošterski cistercijánski klošter)

The first Szentgotthárd church and abbey was built in 1183 and demolished in 1604. The second church was built in the mid 1600s, but went out of use 100 years later. The current third church was built in 1748 and is still in use today.

== History ==
=== First church ===
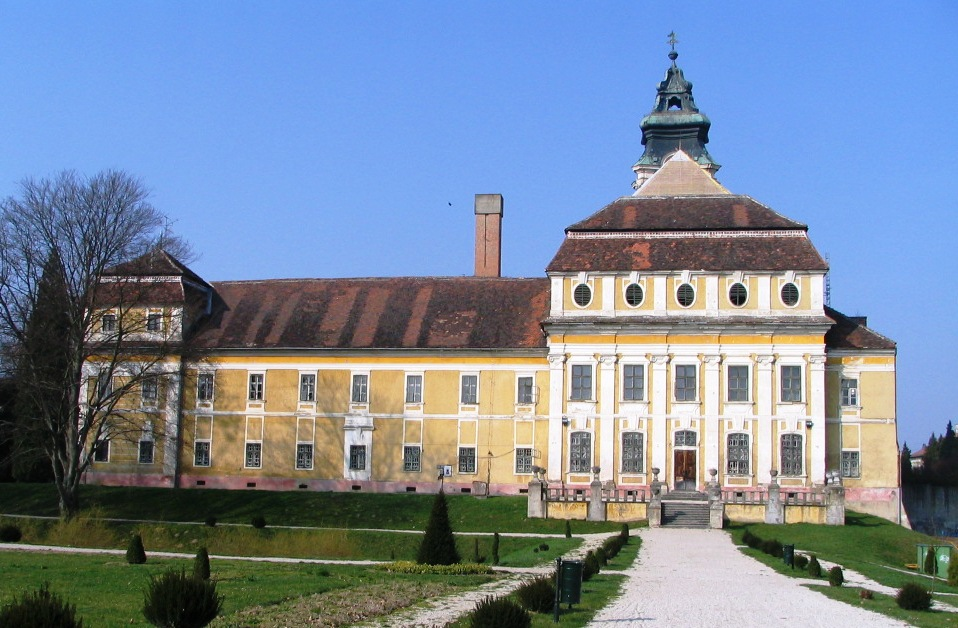
Another view of the abbey

In 1183, Hungarian King Béla III (1173–1196) founded a monastery in honor of Saint Gotthard at the confluence of the Rába and Lapincs rivers. Twelve Cistercian monks from Trois-Fontaines Abbey, France arrived in Hungary to staff the new Szentgotthárd monastery. The king hoped that the monks would provide technical aid to local farmers and also found new settlements in the area. establishing settlements in this borderland and bringing them into the mainstream of the country.

The Cistercians started building the Szentgotthárd monastery in 1184. The building complex itself, with its 94 m by 44 m foundations. Small agricultural villages were quickly established around the monastery.

In 1391, King Sigismund (1361–1437) gave the right of presentation of the Szentgotthárd monasteryto the palatine Miklós Széchy and his son. This right at first merely meant that on the occasion of war or other fighting the warriors of the monastery marched under the Széchy's banner and they had a say in electing the abbot. Later, the patrons wielded absolute power over the monastery, which was the occasion of many abuses.

In 1550, the monks were evicted and the Szentgotthárd monastery was converted into a fortified castle to defend against the advancing Ottomans. In 1556, the monks petitioned Margit Széchy for permission to return to the monastery, but she denied their request.

In 1604, after hearing about the Bocskay uprising., town-governor Wolfgang Tieffenbach, blew up the Szentgotthárd monastery and church.

=== Second Church ===
György Széchenyi, archbishop of Kalocsa, acquired the Szentgotthárd monastery right of presentation from Leopold I, King of Hungary (1640–1705) . Széchenyi rebuilt the monastery church between 1676 and 1677. The second church contained three altars in the single nave: in honour of Saint Gotthard, Jesus Christ, and the Virgin Mary.

With the construction of the third Szentgotthárd church and monastery in 1746, the second church was abandoned. Under Joseph II (1765-1790), the church spire was demolished and the church turned into a granary. From then on, the church was simply referred to as a “granary-church”. In 1988, the town council transformed the building into a theater.

=== Third church ===
In 1734, Robert Leeb (1728–1755), the abbot of Heiligenkreuz, secured the Szentgotthárd monastery again for the Cistercian order. The presentation document was dated 29 July 1734 and signed in Vienna by Emperor Charles III.

Five ordained priests and two laymen arrived in Szentgotthárd with the first group of the new “settlers” from Heiligenkreuz. Two laymen had an important role in embellishing of the monastery and the baroque church of Szentgotthárd: the painter Matthias Gusner and the carpenter and woodcarver Kaspar Schretzenmayer. Leeb commissioned Franz Anton Pilgram (1699–1761) to prepare plans for the new monastery and church.

Construction on the third church started in 1740 and the monks moved into the half-finished building in 1746. The foundation stone of the church was laid only on 14 August 1748. The unfinished building was blessed by Fritz Alberik, Leeb's successor. However, the Abbey of Heiligenkreuz did not have the money to finish the building. Only half of the monastery was built.

== Ornamentation ==
The inscription on the traceried façade of the church states that the construction was started by abbot Robert Leeb and finished by his successor Abbot Alberik. The consecration ceremony was held on 16 March 1779 by Szombathely's first bishop János Szily.

=== Frescos ===
The first vault-section's fresco depicts the victory of European forces over the Ottomans at Battle of Saint Gotthard in 1664. It was painted by the Austrian-born Stephan Dorfmeister (1725–1797). The characters in large lettering (known as a chronostikon) in the Roman inscription on one side of the picture conceal the year of the battle: 1664. The English translation of the legend: “The Moon is spread out on the ground by the arms of King Lipót” (Leopold I, 1640–1705, also Holy Roman Emperor), and on the opposite side: “As the foe of the faith ran routed by Thee, so let this place be in safety under Thy protection, Our Lady.”

The second vault-section, in the centre of the church, has a fresco painted by Matthias Gusner (1694–1772): “The Triumph of the Crucifix”. In the picture light is streaming from God's name Jahweh,. Leading the host of heaven, the Archangel Michael is fighting for the victory of this name so as to defeat the Evil. The Devil's heresy is annihilated by the tool of redemption: the Crucifix.

The fresco in the third vault-section over the sanctum was painted by Dorfmeister. It details John the Evangelist's apparition in Pathmos: “The Heavenly Altar of God’s Lamb”. As a result of his sacrifice, the victorious Lamb sits on a book with seven seals (cf. Book of Revelation 5, 1–5), which contains the eternal plans of God .

=== Altars ===
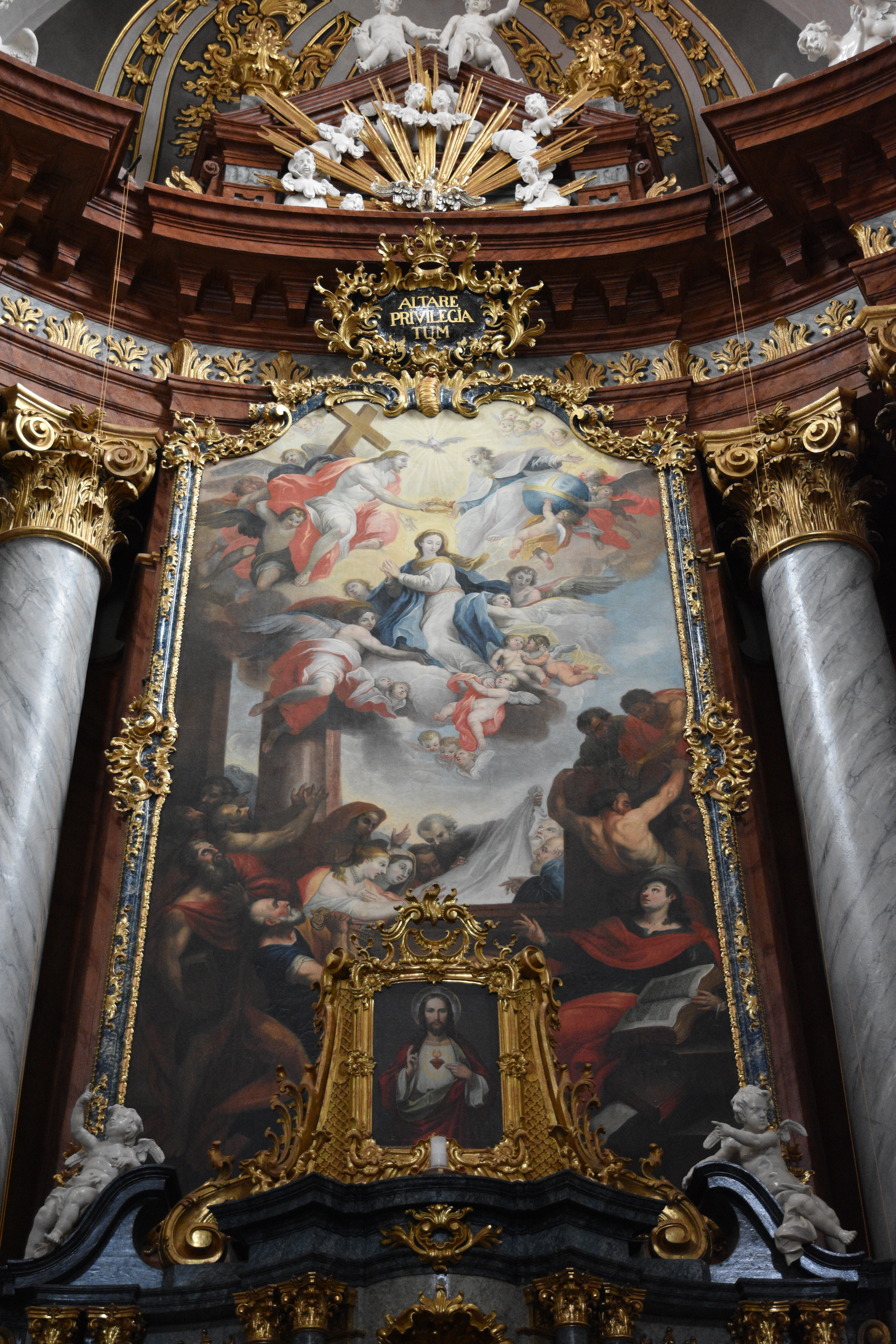
Assumption of the Blessed Virgin Mary

As a Cistercian custom, the church's painting of the high altar illustrates the Assumption of the Blessed Virgin Mary.

The first side altar was erected in honour of Bernard of Clairvaux (1090–1153) In the painting the crucified Christ is bending down towards St. Bernard, who is contemplating the passion of the Savior. The sides of the altar has sculptures of angels holding the “arma Christi”. The oval middle-picture depicts the Pieta and the reliefs portray Saint Peter and Mary Magdalene.

The second side altar commemorates Gotthard of Hildesheim (960–1038), patron saint of the church. The painting illustrates one of the saint's miracles. On the sides of the altar are sculptures of Saint Barbara and St. Catherine of Alexandria. The oval picture shows St. Sebastian and St. Roch, and the reliefs represent St. Margaret of Hungary and St. Dorothea.

The rear altar commemorates the canonized kings of Hungary. The large painting shows St. Stephen, St. Ladislaus (László) and Saint Emeric of Hungary. An angel with drawn sword and holding the Hungarian shield battles for Hungary. On the sides of the altar are the sculptures of St. Agnes and St. Apollonia. The saints in the oval picture in the middle are also Roman martyrs, the two brothers: John and Paul. The reliefs represent St. Adalbert and Hedwig of Silesia.

The fourth altar is dedicated to St. Joseph. The painting shows the deathbed of Joseph with Jesus and Mary standing nearby. One of the angels is holding a sign in his hand preaching a moral lesson: “lo and behold, the way a just man dies”. On the sides of the altar are sculptures of angels. In the middle of the oval picture is a painting of a guardian angel, and on the reliefs are the figures of Frances of Rome and St. Wendelin. The paintings of the main and the side altars are indicative of Matthias Gusner.

=== Other furnishings ===
The pulpit has two small angels sitting on the basket decorated with garlands. The middle of the pulpit shows Jesus teaching the Samaritan woman at Jacob's well. The angels hold the symbols of the Old and New Testaments: the two Tablets of Stone and the papal tiara. The pulpit was manufactured in the workshop of Kaspar Schretzenmayer

The glass coffin contains St. Vincent martyr's relic-skeleton.

The choir has twenty seats. The benches and the sacristy's dressing cupboards were carved by Schretzenmayer

The sculptures of the church are the works of Joseph Schnitzer (1707–1769), a Cistercian sculptor from Heiligenkreuz. The first organ of the church was built in 1764 in the workshop of organ builder Ferdinand Schwartz. In 1987, a new mechanism was built into the baroque organ by the Aquincum organ factory in Budapest.
