= Astenois =

Division of territory in the Roman and Frankish empires

Astenois (Latin pagus Stadunensis) was a pagus, the most basic division of territory in the Roman and Frankish empires. In the Middle Ages, it comprised the parishes of the deaconries of Sainte-Menehould and Possesse. Originally a part of Lotharingia, by the eleventh century its southern part belonged to the Holy Roman Empire and its northern part to the Kingdom of France. The original seat of its counts was at Le Vieil-Dampierre.

Traditionally, Astenois, Dormois and Castrice, the three eastern pagi of the archdiocese of Reims were held to belong to the empire. In the eleventh century, as part of a general fragmentation of power in the region, new counties were formed which did not correspond to ancient pagi but were instead named after their main castles. The county of Astenois, which did correspond to an old pagus, became known as the county of Dampierre after its rulers' chief fortress.

The counts of Astenois were originally a cadet branch of the counts of Toul. The county was produced through the division of the patrimony of Frederick II. The elder son, Renard III, received Toul, while the younger, Peter, received Astenois.

Astenois may originally have been a small fief of the bishops of Toul. It may have passed from the last count of the old line, Renard II, to the first count of the new, Frederick I, through the marriage of the latter to the former's daughter, Gertrude, at the same time as the bishop made Frederick count of Toul (1059). Frederick and Gertrude's son, Frederick II, then divided the patrimony for his sons.

== List of counts and lords ==
- Peter
- Frederick
- Henry
- Renard I
- Renard II
- Renard III
- Renard IV
- Anselm I
- Anselm II
- John I
- John II

== Bibliography ==
- Barthélémy, Anatole de (1884). "Chartes de départ et de retour des comtes de Dampierre-en-Astenois: IV^{e} et V^{e} croisades". Archives de l'Orient Latin. 2: 184–207.
- Barthélemy, Anatole de (1888). "Le comté d'Astenois et les comtes de Dampierre-le-Château". Revue de Champagne et de Brie. 25: 401–16.
- Barthélemy, Anatole de (1889–1891). "Le comté d'Astenois et les comtes de Dampierre-le-Château". Revue de Champagne et de Brie. Série 2.
  - Vol. 1 (1889), pp. 177–191
  - Vol. 2 (1890), pp. 801–807
  - Vol. 3 (1891), pp. 691–699
- Brouillon, Louis-Julien (1886). Les comtes de Dampierre-en-Astenois. Châlons.
- Parisse, Michel (2008) [1999]. "Lotharingia". In Timothy Reuter (ed.). The New Cambridge Medieval History, Volume III: c.900–c.1024. Cambridge University Press. pp. 310–27.
