= Neufchâtel-en-Saosnois =

- Commune
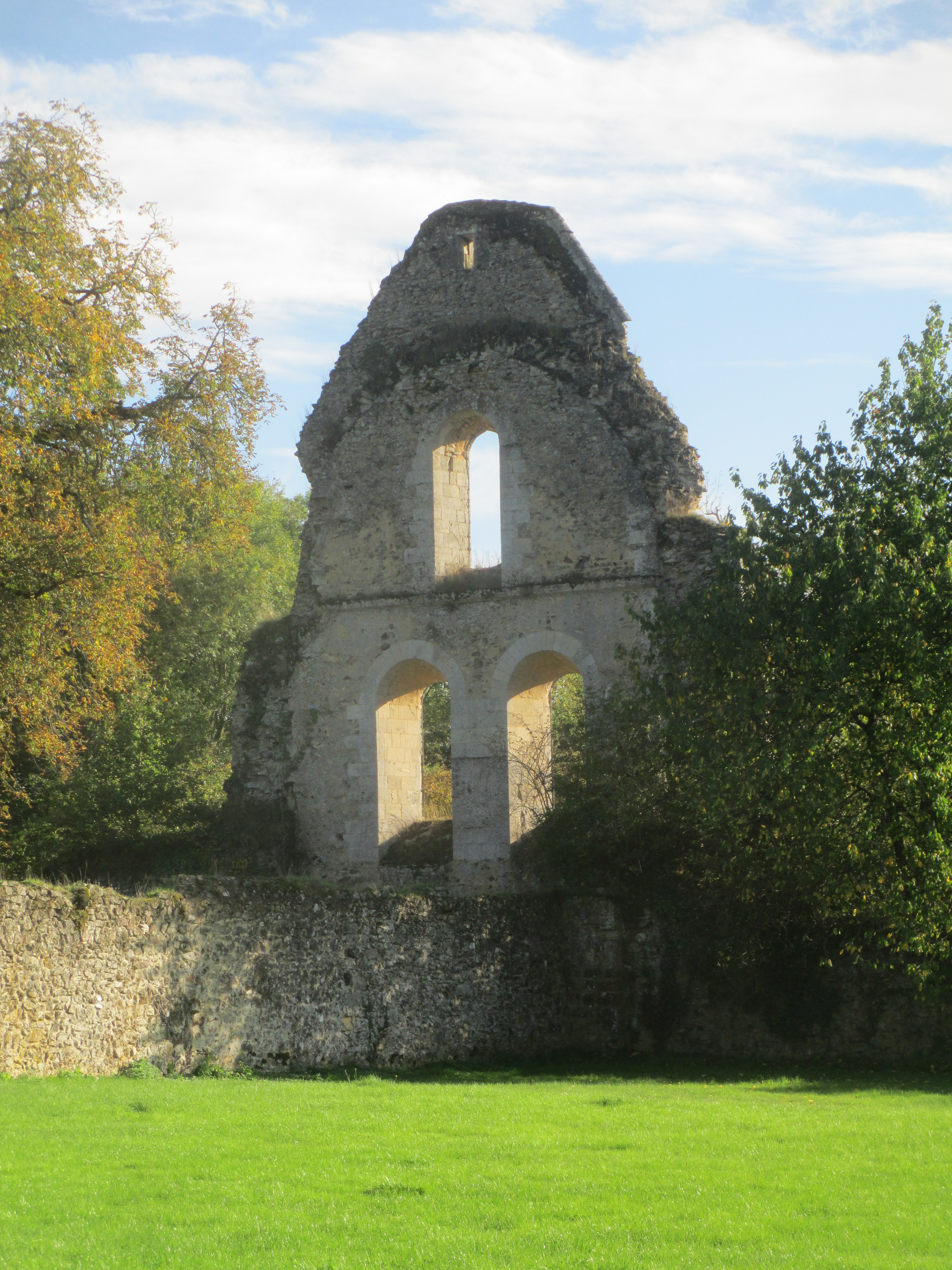
- The ruins of the abbey of Perseigne
- Location of Neufchâtel-en-Saosnois
- Location within France Location within Pays de la Loire
- Coordinates: 48°22′37″N 0°14′43″E
- Country: France
- Region: Pays de la Loire
- Department: Sarthe
- Arrondissement: Mamers
- Canton: Mamers
- Intercommunality: Maine Saosnois

Government
  - Mayor (2020–2026): Jean-Denis Guibert
- Area^{1}: 23.41 km^{2} (9.04 sq mi)
- Highest elevation: 306 m (1,004 ft)
- Lowest elevation: 121 m (397 ft)
- Population (2023): 1,003
  - Density: 42.84/km^{2} (111.0/sq mi)
- Demonym(s): Neufchâtellois, Neufchâtelloise
- Time zone: UTC+01:00 (CET)
  - Summer (DST): UTC+02:00 (CEST)
- INSEE/Postal code: 72215 /72600
- ^{1} French Land Register data, which excludes lakes, ponds, glaciers > 1 km^{2} (0.386 sq mi or 247 acres) and river estuaries.

Neufchâtel-en-Saosnois is a commune in the Sarthe department in the region of Pays de la Loire in north-western France.

The ruins of the Cistercian Perseigne Abbey, a monument historique, are located in the commune.

== See also ==
- Communes of the Sarthe department
- Parc naturel régional Normandie-Maine
