= Philip II (bishop of Châlons) =

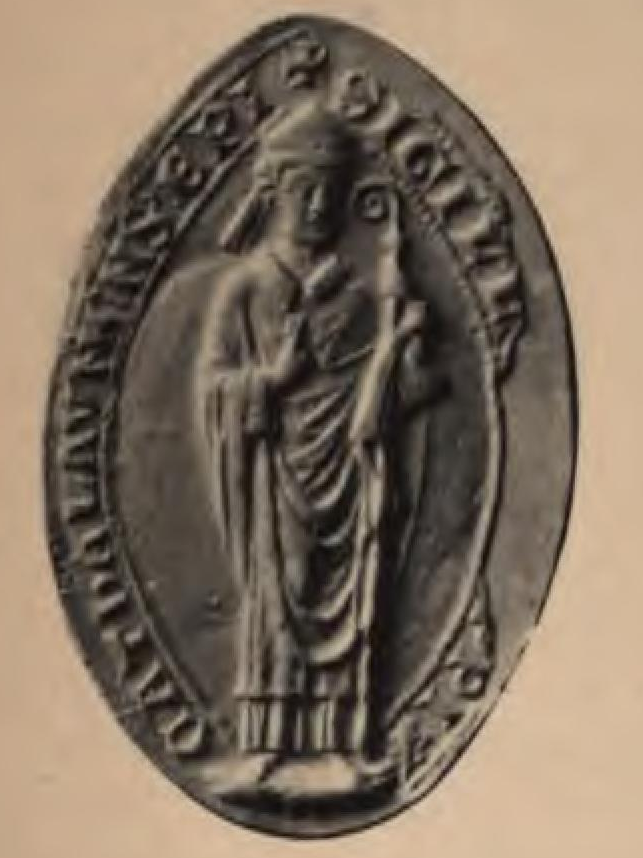
Philip's seal from 1234

Philip II (died 12 April 1237), called Philippe de Méréville or Philippe de Nemours, (Note: He is sometimes called Philippe de Nemours-Méréville. Some English sources give Philip de Merville. A contemporary document refers to him as Magister Ph. de Nemosio. Denis de Sainte-Marthe (1751), Gallia christiana in provincia ecclesiasticas distributa, vol. 9, Paris: Typographia regia, p. 886, states that the name Méréville is incorrect, and that de Nemours is correct.) was the bishop of Châlons from 1228 until his death. He was a member of the nobility of the Île-de-France, and was a priest in Paris before coming to Châlons. As bishop, he was a consistent ally of Count Theobald IV of Champagne, in whose county his diocese lay.

== Early life ==
Philip was the second son of Orson I, lord of Méréville, and his wife Liesse. Orson himself was the son of Walter I, lord of Nemours. Philip's elder brother, Orson II, inherited Méréville while he was destined for the church. Two other brothers, Guillaume and Galeran, are barely mentioned and probably died young.

Philip became a canon at Notre Dame de Paris during the episcopate of his uncle, Pierre de Nemours (1208–19). His father did, however, provide him with material support by giving him suzerainty over the fief of Chevrainvilliers. In 1208, when the fiefholder, Gautier Giffard, gave the land of Verteau, which belonged to Chevrainvilliers to the hôtel-Dieu of Nemours without Philip's permission, the bishop intervened to negotiate a settlement wherein Gautier paid Philip 100 sols parisis for the violation. Philip was evidently already educated since he was titled magister in the final settlement.

Sometime between 1210 and 1215, Philip assisted at the ceremony where the abbot of Coulombs swore an oath to the bishop upon taking over the spiritual direction of the church of Saint-Germain-en-Laye. In 1227, Philip succeeded Ernaud de Cuverville as dean of the chapter at Notre Dame, although he was not formally invested for at least year.

== Bishop ==
In 1226, the bishop of Châlons, William, who was also the count of Perche, died. It took two years for the chapter to elect a successor. Their first choice, Henri de Dreux, a member of the royal family, refused. He later became archbishop of Reims. Their second choice, Pierre de Colmieu, likewise refused. He later became archbishop of Rouen. In a third round of voting, the leading candidates were initially Barthélémy, canon of Orléans, and Robert de Thorotte, brother of the bishop of Verdun. In the end, however, the chapter settled on Philip, the canon from Paris. His election has been credited to the influence of his aged father and of Queen Blanche of Castile, then regent of the kingdom for her son, Louis IX.

Throughout his episcopate, the county of Champagne, in which Châlons was located, was troubled by rebellions. Philip, however, stayed loyal to Count Theobald IV and mostly kept the church in Champagne loyal as well. In 1233, Philip released Theobald from debts contracted by his predecessor. After 1232, Theobald had to contend with the rival claim of Alice, ex-queen of Cyprus, to the county of Champagne. Philip threatened Alice with excommunication, but in November 1234 he affixed his seal to the act of cession and indemnity that settled the dispute.

In 1233, Philip assisted at the consecration of the abbey of Saint-Antoine-des-Champs in Paris. That year he also dealt with disputes between the Abbey of Monthiers-en-Argonne and Count Renard II of Dampierre-en-Astenois. On 15 July 1235, he attended a church council at Saint-Quentin and on 3 August another one at Compiègne. In 1236, he joined several other bishops in supporting the efforts of Theobald, who had inherited the throne of Navarre, in 1234, to secure the rights to that throne for his daughter and heiress, Blanche, betrothed to the future John I, Duke of Brittany.

In 1237, Philip sat on a three-bishop panel that determined the form of the homage to be performed by Joan, Countess of Flanders. He died in April 1237. The obituary of the Abbey of Barbeau gives the day as 15 April, while the anniversary of his death was commemorated annually on 8 April at Notre Dame de Paris. He left 500 livres parisis to Notre Dame for masses to be said for his soul. This money was delivered by his official, Gui de Palaiscau. He was succeeded as bishop by Geoffroy de Grand Pré.
