= Thomas of Perseigne =

12th-century Cistercian theologian

Thomas of Perseigne, also known as Thomas of Cîteaux, Thomas Cisterciensis, Thomas the Cistercian, and Thomas of Vancelles (died c.1190), was a Cistercian monk of Perseigne Abbey, in what is now Sarthe, France. He is known for one major work, a commentary on the Song of Songs.

His theology is regarded as typical of the mystical approach current in the twelfth century. The commentary contains his theories on aesthetics, and is dedicated to Pons, Bishop of Clermont (in office 1170-1189), formerly Abbot of Clairvaux. It contains a number of citations from classical poets.

His commentary on the Song of Songs is one of the most widely distributed medieval commentaries, with 78 surviving manuscripts, and mention of seven other lost copies. Only three other medieval commentaries, those of Bernard of Clairvaux, Honoré of Autun, and the combined commentary of Gregory the Great and Robert of Tombelaine, have been preserved in a larger number of manuscripts. Thomas's commentary was printed five times between 1521 and 1853, demonstrating its enduring popularity due to its modern style and rich content.

Its style is characterised by thorough organisation into parts (distinctiones) and sub-parts, while its content has theological, moral, spiritual, mystical, ecclesiological, mariological and liturgical interpretations, drawn from a multitude of sources.

Three main features give this commentary particular importance. Firstly, it illustrates the impressive diversity of knowledge available in a twelfth-century Cistercian cloister. Secondly, Thomas skilfully combines Cistercian and Victorian spirituality. Finally, the book is not aimed at the most advanced adepts of the spiritual path, but rather at ordinary members of a Cistercian monastic community who are aware of their ordinary status, but who nevertheless seek to rise from the earthly to the divine vision.
