= Perseigne Abbey =

Former Cistercian abbey in France

Coordinates: 48°23′26″N 0°15′44″E

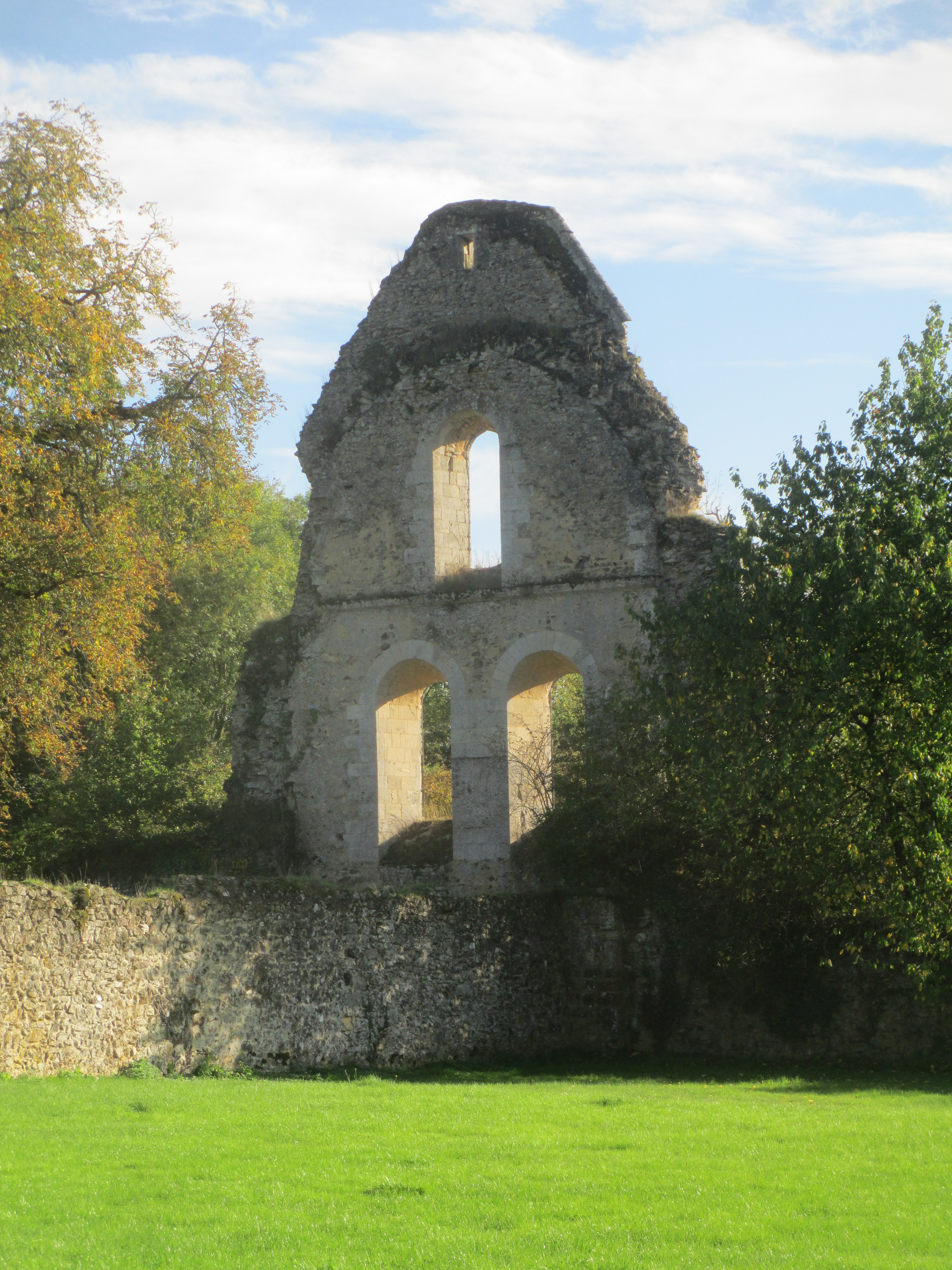
Remains of the abbey church

Perseigne Abbey (French: Abbaye de Perseigne) is a former Cistercian abbey, formally established in 1145 on land given by William III, Count of Ponthieu, (Note: The abbey had been in preparation since 1130 and William's wife, Helie of Burgundy, died there in 1141/42) and suppressed in 1791 during the French Revolution. It is located in the north of the Sarthe département near to Neufchâtel-en-Saosnois, on the edge of the Perseigne forest, not far from Alençon.

The ruins, comprising a few stretches of wall, have been listed since 1932 as a monument historique by the French Ministry of Culture.

The abbey was a daughter house of Cîteaux itself; it was of modest importance within the Cistercian Order and founded no daughter houses of its own. Its temporal life was organised in the 12th and 13th centuries around a network of barns that have been discovered by archaeological excavation. Two agricultural buildings have left significant traces.

Intellectual life there flourished particularly in the early days. Between 1165 and 1189, the monk Thomas of Perseigne (also called Thomas le Cistercien) composed his Commentaire du Cantique des Cantiques ("Commentary on the Song of Songs"), which enjoyed great success in the west (there are 87 known copies).

The abbot Adam of Perseigne, author of a vast correspondence, served as the link between the Roman papacy, Cistercian Burgundy and English royalty.

== The economic dynamics of the abbey ==
The period of growth in the abbey's assets, which began in 1145 with the first donations from the founder William III and other donors mentioned in the foundation charter, without a precise date, was decisive for its development. The primary objective was to guarantee the monks independence by ensuring that they had all the resources they needed close at hand. As a result, most of the acquisitions were concentrated in the parish where the monastery was established, including the vast lands of La Ragonnière, which were later divided up for more efficient management.

The initial charter also mentions the first barns, including the Antenoise barn, donated to the abbey, which gave the monks virtually complete ownership of the parish. This barn occupied a central position in the territory of Neufchâtel-en-Saosnois, to the south-west. The donations to Neufchâtel were concluded with the Count's vineyards and their annexes.

These donations reflect the Count's desire to provide the abbey with sufficient assets to fully realise the Cistercian ideal and to establish a structuring centre for his possessions in the Saosnois. The donations outside the parish, included in the charter, are also of great importance, with four of the seven possessions designated as barns. Of these, the land of Malèfre, although not designated as a barn until the papal confirmation of 1163, represents one of the abbey's major holdings.

The lack of additional donations from John, son and successor of William III to the county of Alençon and the barony of Saosnois in 1171, can be explained by the scale of the initial donations. Nevertheless, he granted significant privileges to the abbey, testifying to its privileged status. A new phase of growth began in 1188, marked by a series of generous donations, probably linked to the presence of influential figures who encouraged donations. This dynamic is probably associated with the abbatiate of Adam of Perseigne, who began around 1188 and was renowned for his fame and influence.

Personalities such as Richard the Lionheart and Robert I, Count of Alençon and Baron of the Saosnois from 1191, played a major role in this growth by donating new estates to the abbey. These gifts included four new farms, adding to the network of barns. The prosperity of Perseigne Abbey seemed to decline from the second half of the 13th century, marked by a decrease in donations. The monks were forced to rethink the way they managed their estates, turning to farmers to manage certain plots of land. Although this phenomenon was not widespread in the parish, it marked an economic change in the Cistercian way of operating, perhaps influenced by a shortage of convers, a concern noted at the General Chapter in 1274.

== List of abbots (incomplete) ==
- Adam: 1188-1221

== Sources ==
- Bell, David N. (2013). "Le Commentaire du Cantique des Cantiques de Thomas de Perseigne revisité", Les cisterciens dans le Maine et dans l'Ouest au Moyen Âge". Annales de Bretagne et des Pays de l'Ouest (in French). v. 120, n° 3, September: 117–131.
- Doux, Bertrand (2013). "L'abbaye de Perseigne : évolution et gestion d'un patrimoine cistercien dans le Haut-Maine Les cisterciens dans le Maine et dans l'Ouest au Moyen Âge". Annales de Bretagne et des Pays de l'Ouest (in French). v. 120, n° 3, September: 65–84.
- Maillet, Laurent (2013). "Les missions d'Adam de Perseigne, émissaire de Rome et de Cîteaux (1190-1221)", Les cisterciens dans le Maine et dans l'Ouest au Moyen Âge". Annales de Bretagne et des Pays de l'Ouest (in French). v.120, n° 3, September: 99–116.
- Power, Daniel (2004). The Norman Frontier in the Twelfth and Early Thirteenth Centuries. Cambridge University Press.
- Reinbold, Aurélie (2013). "Les cercles de l'amitié dans la correspondance d'Adam de Perseigne (1188-1221)", Les cisterciens dans le Maine et dans l'Ouest au Moyen Âge". Annales de Bretagne et des Pays de l'Ouest (in French). v. 120, n° 3, September: 87–98.
