= Marie Victor Poterlet =

French wallpaper designer

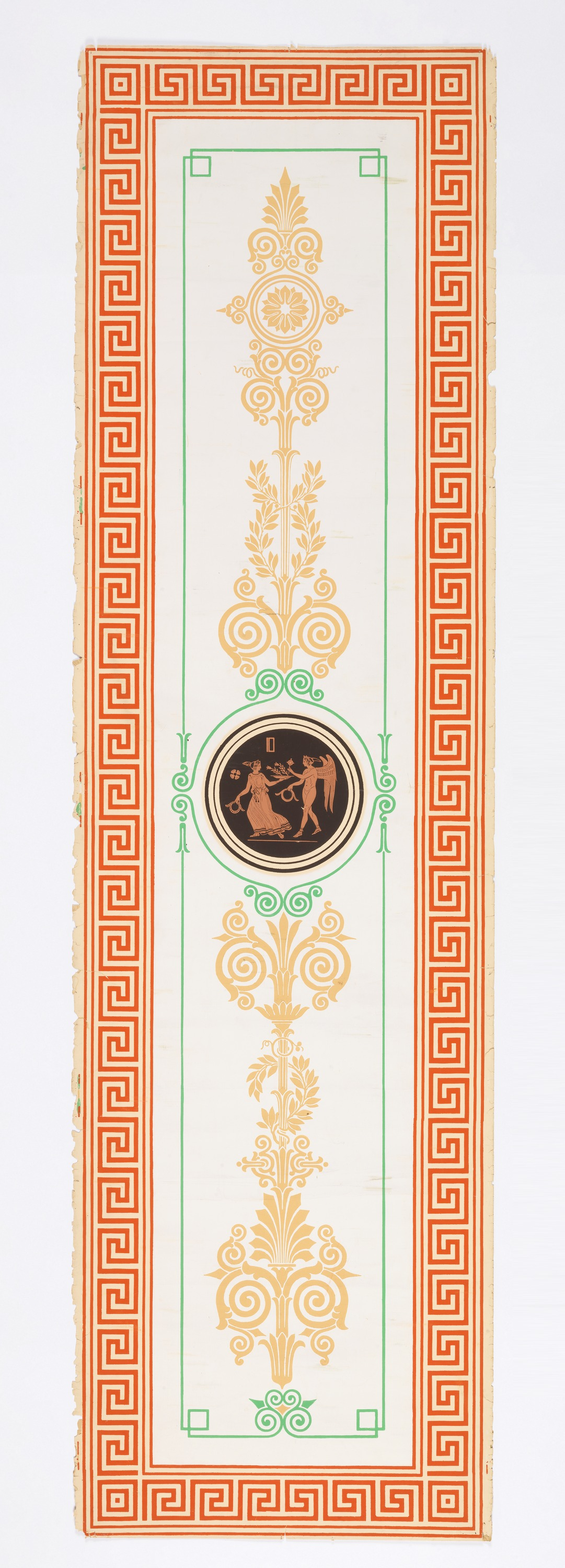
Decorative wallpaper pane by Poterlet

Marie Victor Ignace Poterlet also called Marie Poterlet, Victor Poterlet, and M. Victor Poterlet (1811–1889) was a 19th-century French wallpaper designer, engraver and printmaker. His work is held in the collections of the Bibliothèque nationale de France and the Cooper Hewitt Smithsonian Design Museum.

== Early life ==
Porterlet was born in Auve, France in 1811.

== Career ==
Poterlet was a well-known wallpaper designer in the late 19th-century. His work is included in the 1847 book Ornements du 19me siècle Inventés et dessinés par divers artistes industriels et gravés par Martin Riester.

His 56-page sample book (numbered 1162) included machined and hand-made wallpaper samples made from embroideries, cut paper, and laces and is held in the Bibliothèque Forney (English Forney Library) in Paris, France.

A collection of his work is held in the collection of the Bibliothèque nationale de France, and the Cooper Hewitt Smithsonian Design Museum.

== Family life ==
Poterlet had a son, Henri Poterlet, who was also an ornamental engraver.
