= Auve =

- Commune
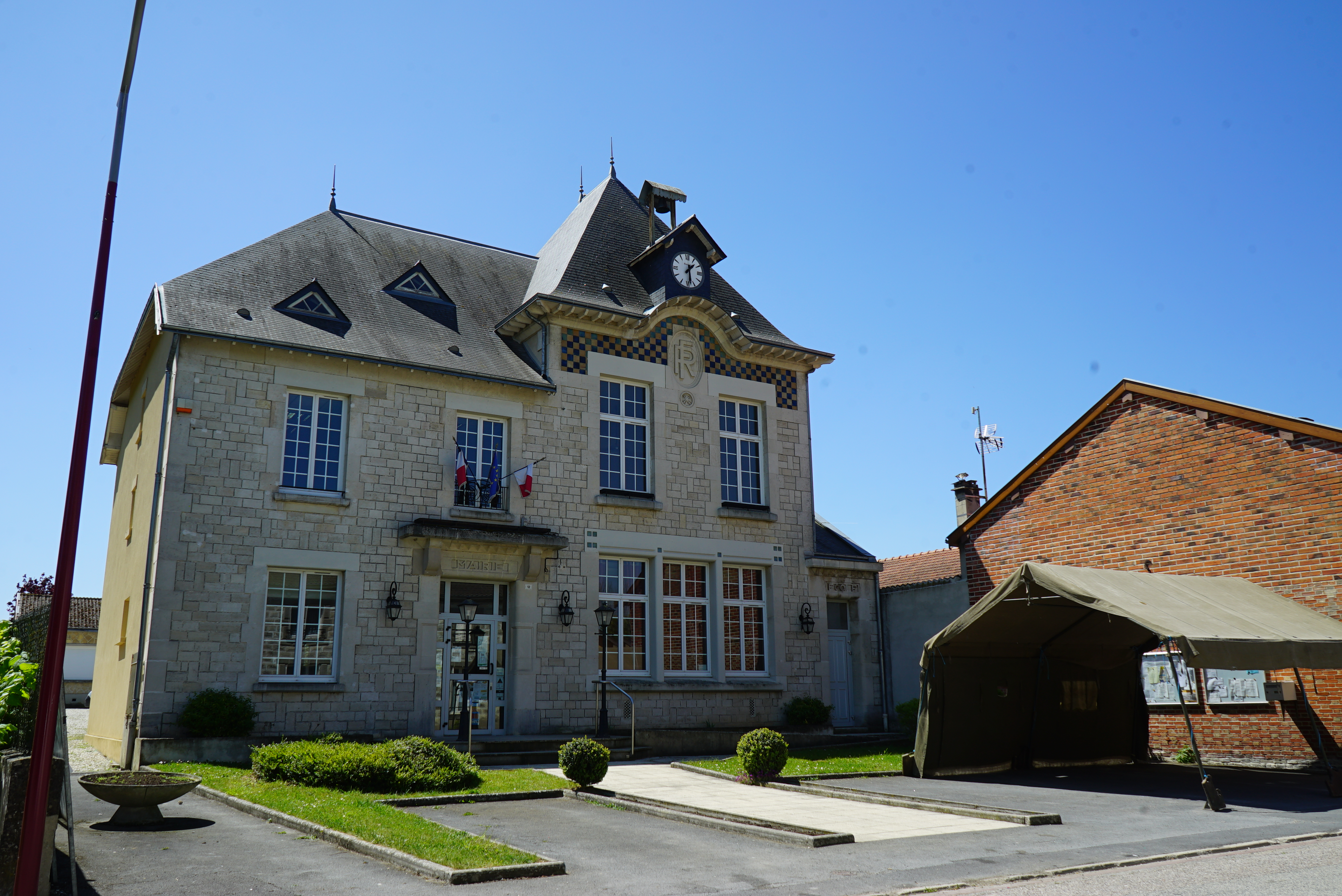
- The town hall in Auve
- Location of Auve
- Location within France Location within Grand Est
- Coordinates: 49°02′05″N 4°41′44″E
- Country: France
- Region: Grand Est
- Department: Marne
- Arrondissement: Châlons-en-Champagne
- Canton: Argonne Suippe et Vesle
- Intercommunality: CC Argonne Champenoise

Government
  - Mayor (2020–2026): Vincent Rouvroy
- Area^{1}: 23.3 km^{2} (9.0 sq mi)
- Elevation: 162 m (531 ft)
- Population (2023): 314
  - Density: 13.5/km^{2} (34.9/sq mi)
- Time zone: UTC+01:00 (CET)
  - Summer (DST): UTC+02:00 (CEST)
- INSEE/Postal code: 51027 /51800
- ^{1} French Land Register data, which excludes lakes, ponds, glaciers > 1 km^{2} (0.386 sq mi or 247 acres) and river estuaries.

Auve (French pronunciation: [ov]) is a commune in the Marne department in northeastern France. The source of the river Auve is in the commune.

== Population ==
Historical population
Year	Pop.	±% p.a.
1968	285	—
1975	254	−1.63%
1982	241	−0.75%
1990	229	−0.64%
1999	219	−0.49%
2007	232	+0.72%
2012	262	+2.46%
2017	298	+2.61%
2023	314	+0.88%
Source: INSEE

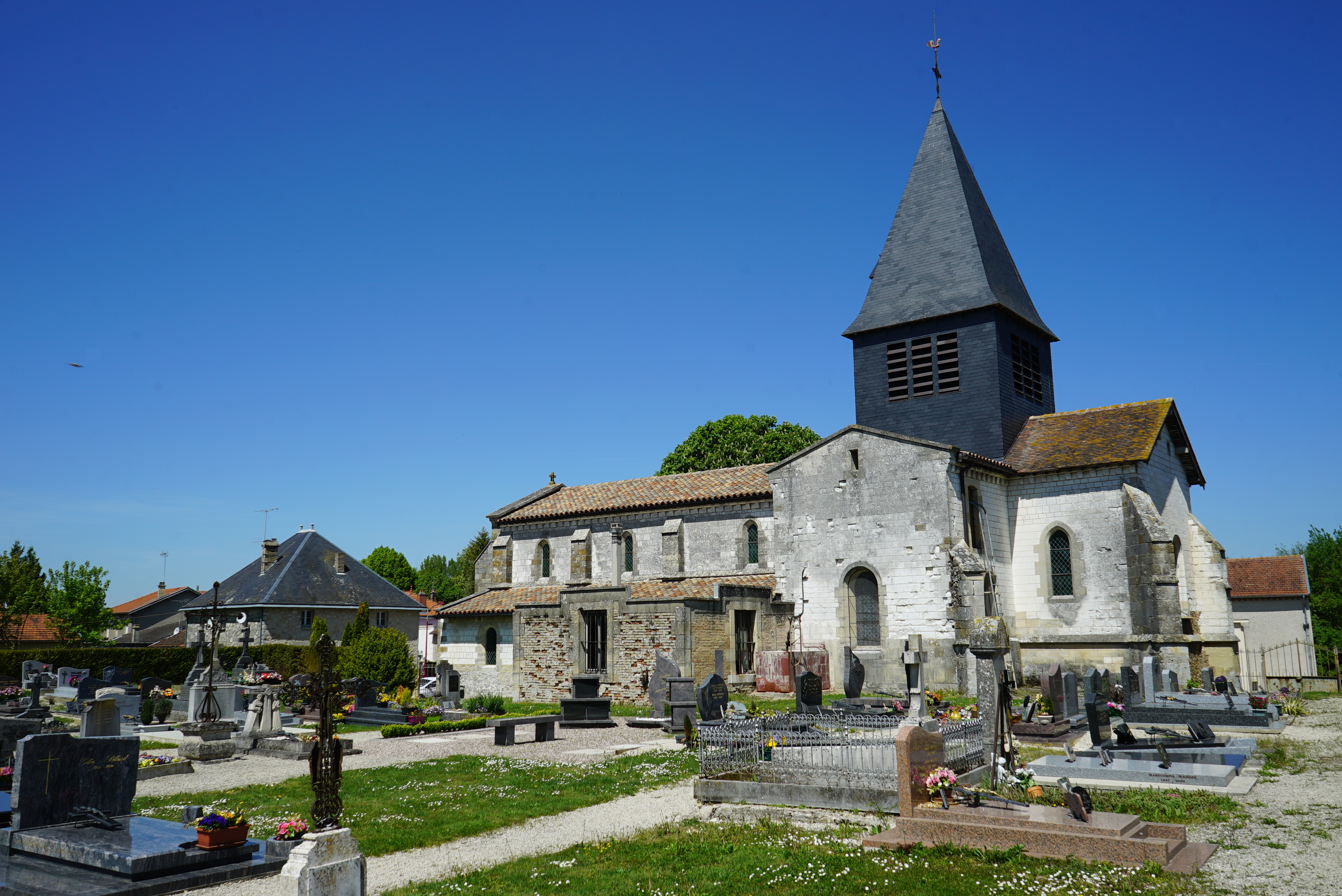

== Notable people ==
- Marie Poterlet (1811–1889) wallpaper designer.

== See also ==
- Communes of the Marne department
