= Trois-Fontaines Abbey =

Abbey in Marne, France

Coordinates: 48°43′07″N 4°56′56″E

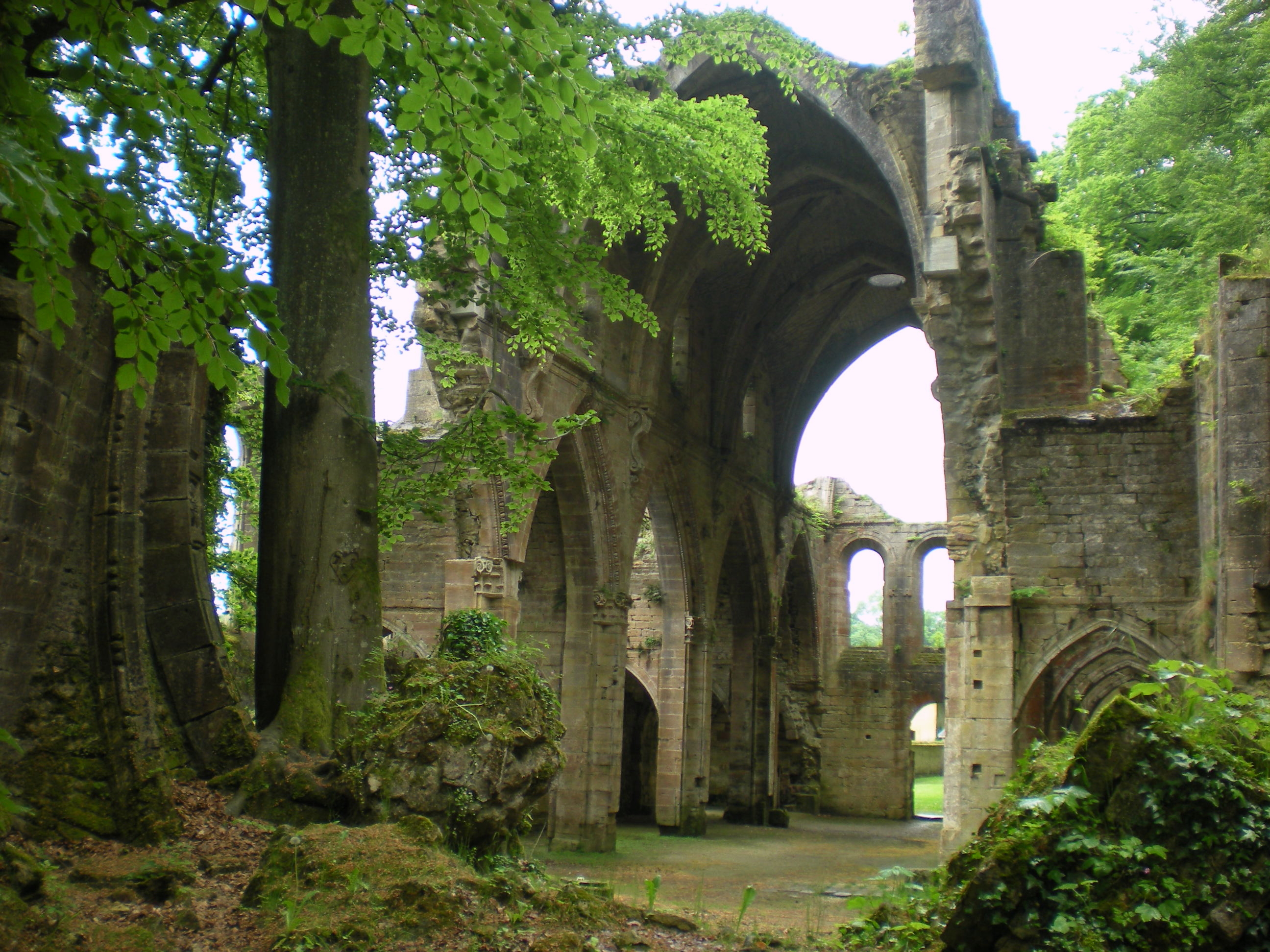
Ruins of the abbey church

Trois-Fontaines Abbey (French: Abbaye de Sainte-Marie des Trois-Fontaines) was a Cistercian abbey in the present commune of Trois-Fontaines-l'Abbaye in the French department of Marne, in the historic province of Champagne.

== History ==
It was the first daughter-house founded by Clairvaux Abbey, one of the four Cistercian primary abbeys, and was established north of the head of navigation of the Marne at Saint-Dizier by Bernard of Clairvaux in 1118, on isolated woodland given by Hugh de Vitry, which the monks drained. It was a large community, comprising at its height some 130 monks.

The abbey was very active in its first century or so in the settlement of daughter houses:

- Lachalade Abbey (1127)
- Orval Abbey in Belgium (1132)
- Haute-Fontaine Abbey (1136)
- Cheminon Abbey (1138)
- Châtillon Abbey (1142)
- Monthiers-en-Argonne Abbey (1144)
- Szentgotthárd Abbey in Hungary (1183)
- Belin Studenac Abbey, Belafons, in Vojvodina, Serbia (1234)

James of Pecorara, later a cardinal, was elected abbot in 1215. The chronicler Alberic of Trois-Fontaines, who covered the years 1227 to 1241, was a monk here.

The abbey's isolated site protected it from armed attack. It fell however into the hands of commendatory abbots in 1536. Between 1716 and 1741, the abbot in commendam was Pierre Guérin de Tencin, French ambassador in Rome, who was made a cardinal in 1739. He rebuilt it, making good the damage caused by a fire in 1703. In 1790 it was sold off, and the premises largely demolished for the sake of the building materials.

== Buildings ==
The monumental gateway dates from the 18th century rebuild. It has a concave façade with four very large pilasters with Corinthian capitals and supports a terrace surrounded by a balustrade. Beyond a courtyard stands a further gateway with a coat of arms and building in the style of Louis XV.

Imposing ruins are all that remain of the abbey church, constructed between 1160 and 1190, originally about 70 metres long and 40 metres broad across the transept, on a cruciform ground plan. The portal is dominated by three large round-arched windows. The lower portion of the surround of the large rose window is extant, which fills almost the entire width of the west front. The first three bays of the nave are noticeably wider than the rest. The vault of the first is gone, but that of the next three remains, supported on massive corbels. The vaults of the next three bays collapsed in the 19th century. The side aisles have pointed barrel vaulting and are separated from the nave by pointed arches. Between 1785 and 1789 the rectangular choir and the transept with three chapels on either arm had become dilapidated almost to the point of collapse, and were replaced by a semi-circular termination on the east side of the transept.

Today the Romanesque and Early Gothic abbey church has been stabilised as a picturesque ruin. The outbuildings accommodate a bicycle museum.
