= Adam of Perseigne =

French Cistercian and abbot of Perseigne Abbey

Adam of Perseigne (c. 1145 – 1221) was a French Cistercian, abbot of Perseigne Abbey in the Diocese of Le Mans.

== Biography ==
Adam was born around 1145 into a serf, or peasant, family. He is thought to have been first a canon regular, later a Benedictine of Marmoutier Abbey, Tours, and then a Cistercian. In 1188, he became abbot of Perseigne Abbey, to which his reputation for holiness and wisdom drew the great personages of his time to seek his advice. He was for a time the confessor to King Richard Lionheart of England. He had at Rome a conference with the celebrated mystic, Joachim, Abbot of Flora, (in Calabria, Italy), on the subject of the latter's revelations, and aided Foulques de Neuilly in preaching during the Fourth Crusade. He died in 1221.

== Works ==
His sermons were published at Rome in 1662, under the title Adami Abbatis Perseniæ Ordinis Cisterciensis Mariale. About half his known letters remained in circulation after the invention of the printing press in various collected formats. These collections were subsequently incorporated into the Patrologia Latina in volume CCXI.

Many of his letters were addressed to members of the House of Champagne (e.g. the countesses of Chartres and of Châlons) and to the bishops and leading ecclesiastics of the dioceses of Le Mans, Chartres and of Normandy (especially Rouen). A virgin, Agnes, is addressed several times in the final volume. Adam's letters have strong moral as well as spiritual content (examples among many, those to the Rouen ecclesiastics).

During his abbatiate (1188-1221), Adam emerged as one of the leaders of Cîteaux and his reputation spread far beyond the confines of his order. The Abbot of Perseigne was a spiritual master of great authority, as evidenced by his abundant correspondence and illustrious addressees. It was this high reputation that led to him being called upon by Rome and Cîteaux to carry out delicate missions. In light of Adam de Perseigne's personality, his networks of influence and, in particular, his links with Richard the Lionheart and Innocent III, this article aims to explain why Rome and Cîteaux called on his good offices.

== Missions ==
Thirteen missions were carried out by Adam, including eight entrusted by Innocent III, three for the General Chapter, one jointly requested by Rome and Cîteaux, and one without an identified sponsor. It is likely that Adam carried out other missions, many of which have not been documented. The diversity and importance of the missions delegated to the Abbot of Perseigne immediately testify to the extent of his influence and skills.

=== Reform missions ===
On four occasions, Innocent III commissioned Adam, often in collaboration with other religious, to reform communities and dioceses, or at least to resolve complex disputes in order to put an end to unrest. For example, in 1207, Innocent III sent Adam, the abbot of Savigny and the bishop of Coutances to Mont-Saint-Michel to remedy Abbot Jourdain's governance problems. A second mission to the Mont in 1210 and Jourdain's death in 1212 brought peace to the abbey.

=== Diplomatic missions ===
Adam de Perseigne also carried out missions linked to eminent personalities and major political events. Three of the six major missions concerned Richard the Lionheart. For example, in 1190, at Richard's request, the Chapter General commissioned Adam and other abbots to find a suitable site for the foundation of Bonport Abbey. In 1208, Innocent III again asked Adam to negotiate a truce between Philip Augustus and John Lackland, with a view to launching the crusade against the Albigensians.

=== Justice missions ===
On three occasions, Adam was asked to arbitrate disputes between religious and secular lords. In 1211 at Marmoutier, he had to judge a dispute between Count Robert du Perche and the prior of Bellême. In 1212, the Chapter General asked Adam and the abbot of Loroux to settle a dispute between the abbot of Tironneau and Patrice de Sourches. At an unknown date, Adam was sent by the Pope to rule on the relinquishment of rights to the church of Saint-Germain de Flers.

== Important networks of influence ==
Thanks to his exceptional personality and monastic background, Adam developed a vast network within the Church and the upper nobility. His connections extended to cloisters in the West, Normandy, Anjou, Touraine and as far afield as Champagne, his native region. Adam maintained links with ecclesiastical and secular figures, including Cardinal Robert de Courçon, Guillaume d'Ély, Eudes de Sully, Guillaume de Bellême, Hamelin and, of course, Innocent III. Locally, he had links with the Counts of Alençon and Perche, as well as powerful families such as the Counts of Champagne and the Plantagenet dynasty. The missions entrusted to Adam seem to be closely linked to his networks of influence, a crucial factor in his appointment.

== Adam and the Plantagenets ==
During his abbatiate (1188-1221), Adam saw three successive Plantagenets as Earl of Maine and King of England: Henry III, at the beginning of his abbatiate, followed by Richard the Lionheart, then John Lackland. Adam's links with the Plantagenets, in addition to their salvific values, presented undeniable political advantages. As a powerful lord, Adam could act as a conduit for Plantagenet power, particularly in winning the favour of the Counts of Ponthieu, Alençon and Perche. However, Adam's influence extended beyond the local level, as his connections within the clergy, particularly at the highest level, could serve the interests of the Plantagenets. The delicate missions entrusted to him by Pope Innocent III bear witness to the trust and esteem he enjoyed in the Vatican. As mentioned above, in 1208, Adam and the Abbot of Le Pin were asked by Innocent III to carry out a political mission aimed at securing a truce between John Lackland and Philip Augustus in order to support the crusade against the Albigensians.

As regards the relationship between Adam and Richard the Lionheart, although Adam became Abbot of Perseigne in 1188, i.e. before Richard's reign in 1189, their meeting was probably linked to their respective positions as Abbot and King-Count of Maine. The mention of Adam as Richard's confessor in certain charters has been called into question, as these documents appear to have been interpolated or falsified. More reliable sources, however, indicate close political ties between Richard and Adam, particularly through missions entrusted by Cîteaux and Rome. Diplomatic missions, such as the search for a site for a new abbey and mediation between Richard and Philip Augustus, highlight Adam's key role in maintaining good relations between the King of England and the Cistercian order. The exact nature of the personal relationship between Adam and Richard remains difficult to assess, but it seems to have had a strong political basis, with perhaps some closer exchanges in the spiritual realm.

Adam also maintained close links with the families of the sovereigns, particularly the women. Adam's correspondence led him, for example, to take a closer look at Eleanor of Aquitaine. In a letter to a nun named Agnes, Adam mentions the queen's promise to give him a pony because of a shortage of mounts. Agnès, one of Adam's privileged correspondents, seems to have lived out her vocation at Fontevraud, where Eleanor retired in 1194. Berengaria, wife and then widow of Richard the Lionheart, was also in contact with Adam. Although the correspondence does not include any letters addressed to Berengaria, she and Adam were involved in negotiations for the construction of the new choir at Le Mans cathedral. Adam was also the first witness to a charter given by Berengaria in 1207. His chaplain, Gautier, Berengaria's official messenger to the English court, succeeded him as abbot in 1221. In addition, Blanche of Navarre, Countess of Champagne and Berengaria's sister, received a letter from Adam. Outside his family, Adam maintained links with members of the Plantagenets. He had a close friendship with Hamelin, Bishop of Le Mans, and exchanged several letters. Hamelin, a Plantagenet loyalist, may have been Henry II's chaplain and confessor. Adam was also linked to Guillaume Longchamp, Bishop of Ely, advising the latter on his political responsibilities. Adam had a friendly relationship with André de Vitré, although there is some doubt as to the exact identity of the recipient of the letter. More generally, Adam de Perseigne played a key political role at the heart of the power plays between the princes, the Church and the aristocracy, highlighting his predominant Plantagenet network and his close links with the latter.

== Notes ==
Attribution
