= Possesse =

- Commune
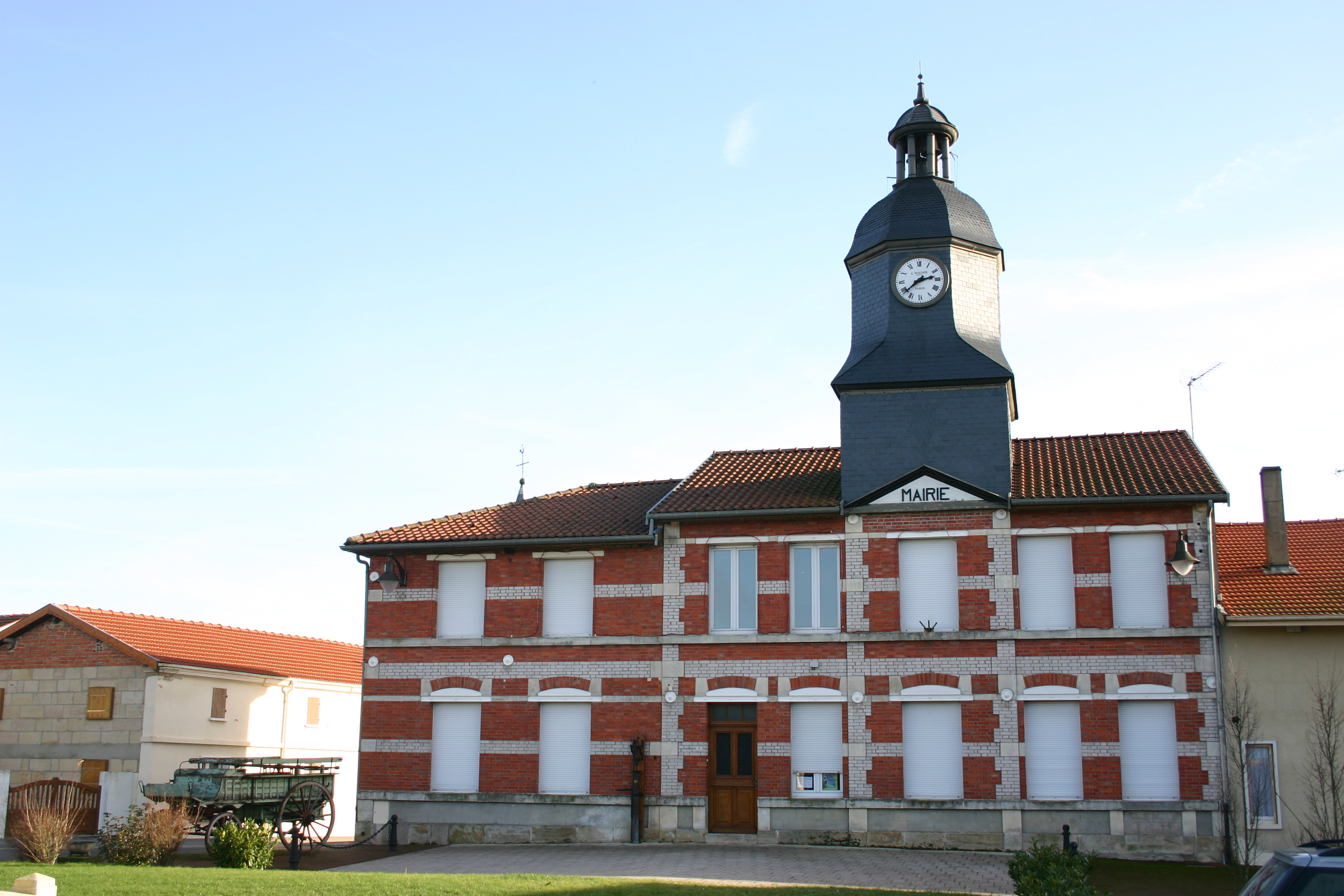
- The town hall in Possesse

- Coat of arms
- Location of Possesse
- Location within France Location within Grand Est
- Coordinates: 48°53′19″N 4°48′19″E
- Country: France
- Region: Grand Est
- Department: Marne
- Arrondissement: Vitry-le-François
- Canton: Sermaize-les-Bains
- Intercommunality: Côtes de Champagne et Val de Saulx

Government
  - Mayor (2020–2026): Régine Labroche
- Area^{1}: 35.87 km^{2} (13.85 sq mi)
- Highest elevation: 193 m (633 ft)
- Lowest elevation: 127 m (417 ft)
- Population (2023): 135
  - Density: 3.76/km^{2} (9.75/sq mi)
- Demonym: Possessiens
- Time zone: UTC+01:00 (CET)
  - Summer (DST): UTC+02:00 (CEST)
- INSEE/Postal code: 51442 /51330
- ^{1} French Land Register data, which excludes lakes, ponds, glaciers > 1 km^{2} (0.386 sq mi or 247 acres) and river estuaries.

Possesse (French pronunciation: [pɔsɛs]) is a commune in the Marne department in north-eastern France. Possesse lies in the rolling countrysides of northeastern France in an area that mostly consists of forests, farmlands, ponds, and small streams.

== See also ==
- Communes of the Marne department
