= Stephan Dorfmeister =

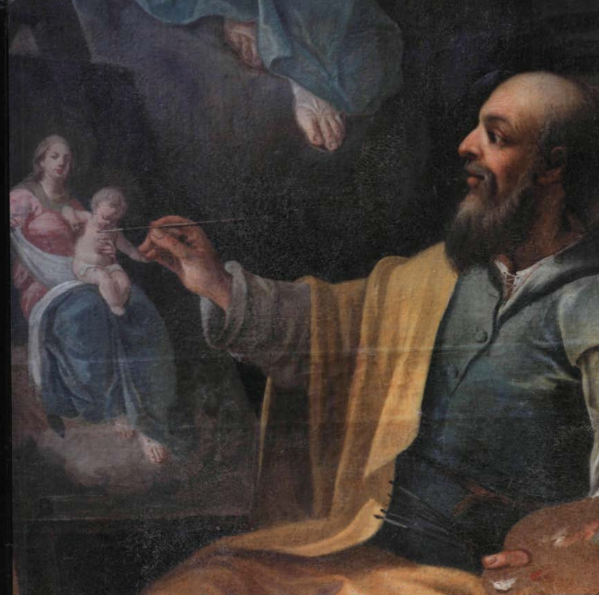
Presumed self-portrait; detail from "Saint Luke Paints his Vision" (1785)

Stephan Dorfmeister or, in Hungarian, Dorffmaister István (1729 – 29 May 1797) was a painter of German ethnicity who worked primarily in Burgenland and Transdanubia (now part of Hungary).

== Biography ==
His year of birth is generally assumed to be 1729, based on parish records from the city of Ödenburg, although some Hungarian sources give the year as 1725. He was born in Vienna as the eldest of five children of Johann Christof Georg Dorfmeister (1705–1789) and his wife Elisabeth, née Millner. Among his siblings was the Austrian sculptor Johann Georg Dorfmeister.

From 1751 to 1758, he studied at the Academy of Fine Arts, Vienna, where his instructors were Paul Troger, the Rector of the academy, and Caspar Franz Sambach, a fresco painter from Silesia. From 1769, he referred to himself as a "foreign" member of the academy, although there are no supporting documents.

After acquiring an expertise in fresco painting, c.1760, he received an order from the Provost of the Premonstratensian abbey in Gschirna for painting the monastery church. In 1761, he worked at the new monastery in Türje. Around 1762, he moved to a home near Ödenburg, but never became a Bürger (citizen) there; possibly to avoid compulsory military service. During this time, he married Anna Franz and they had nine children together. After her death in 1790, he married Katharina Gillig.

He worked mainly in what is now Western Hungary. His primary customers were the Bishops of Steinamanger and Fünfkirchen, as well the region's numerous monasteries. He also had some clientele among the nobility. Many of the secular buildings he decorated have since been destroyed or demolished. Surviving examples include the hall in Nádasdy Castle, the decorations at the Hegyfalu castles near Kotenburg an der Raab and the municipal theater in Ödenburg. About fifty portraits are his.

His three eldest sons assisted in his workshop. The eldest of them, Stephan Joseph Dorfmeister the Younger (1764-1807) helped with projects in Sankt Gotthard. Many works created after 1797 were jointly signed. His next eldest, Joseph Paul Stephan Dorfmeister (born 1770), remained with him in his workshop and completed his last commission; the altarpiece at the church in Magotsch (1798).

Despite his thriving business, he was plagued by financial problems his entire life and left his family deeply in debt. He died in Ödenburg.

== Selected works ==
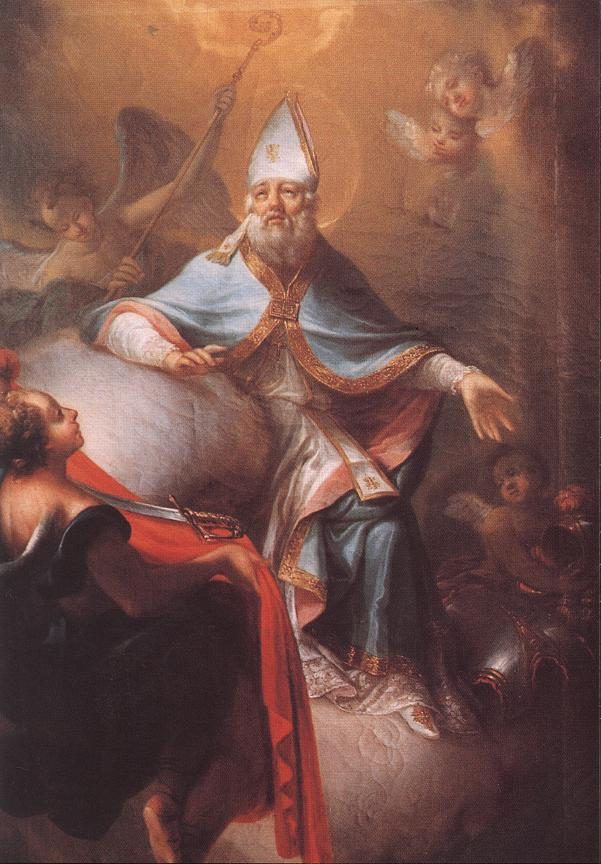
1778: The Transfiguration of
Saint Martin

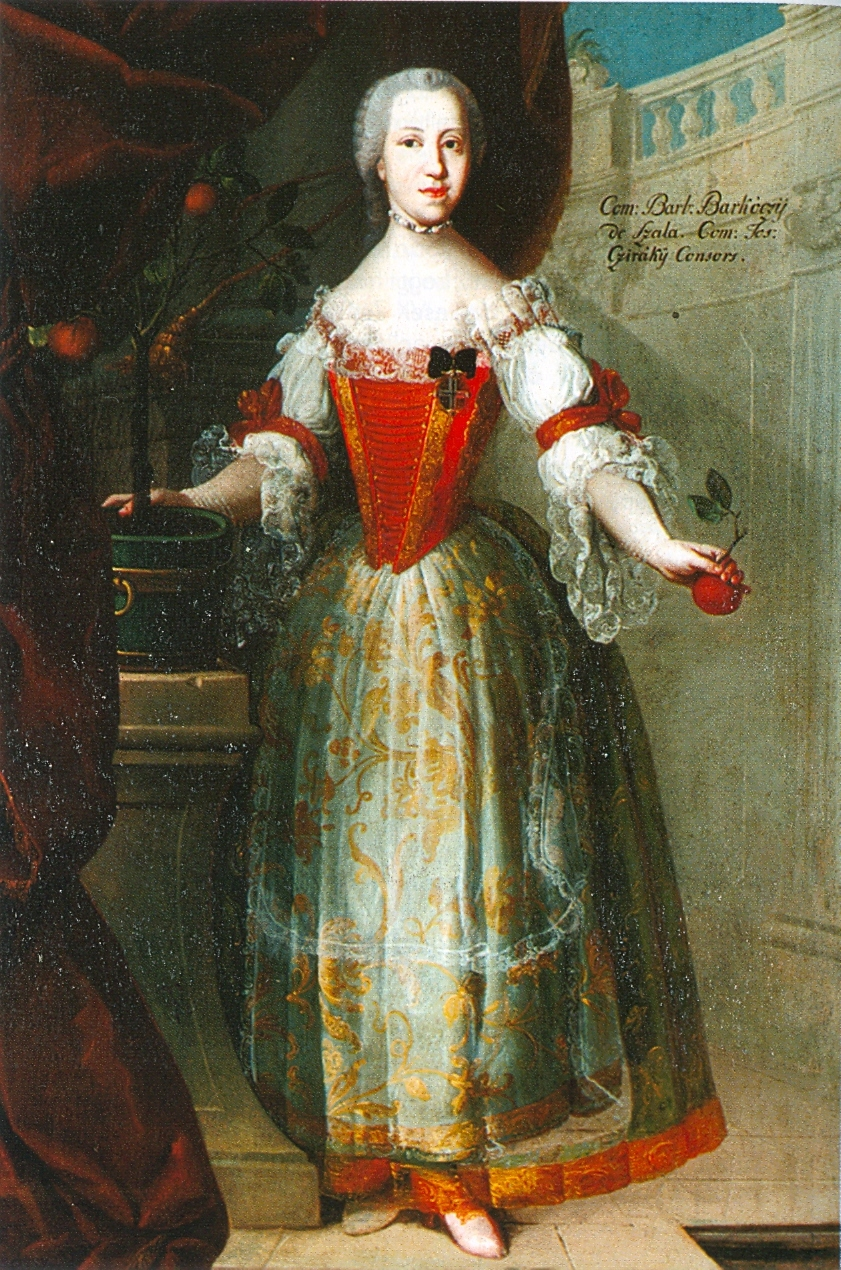
1780: Portrait of the poet, Barkóczy Borbála

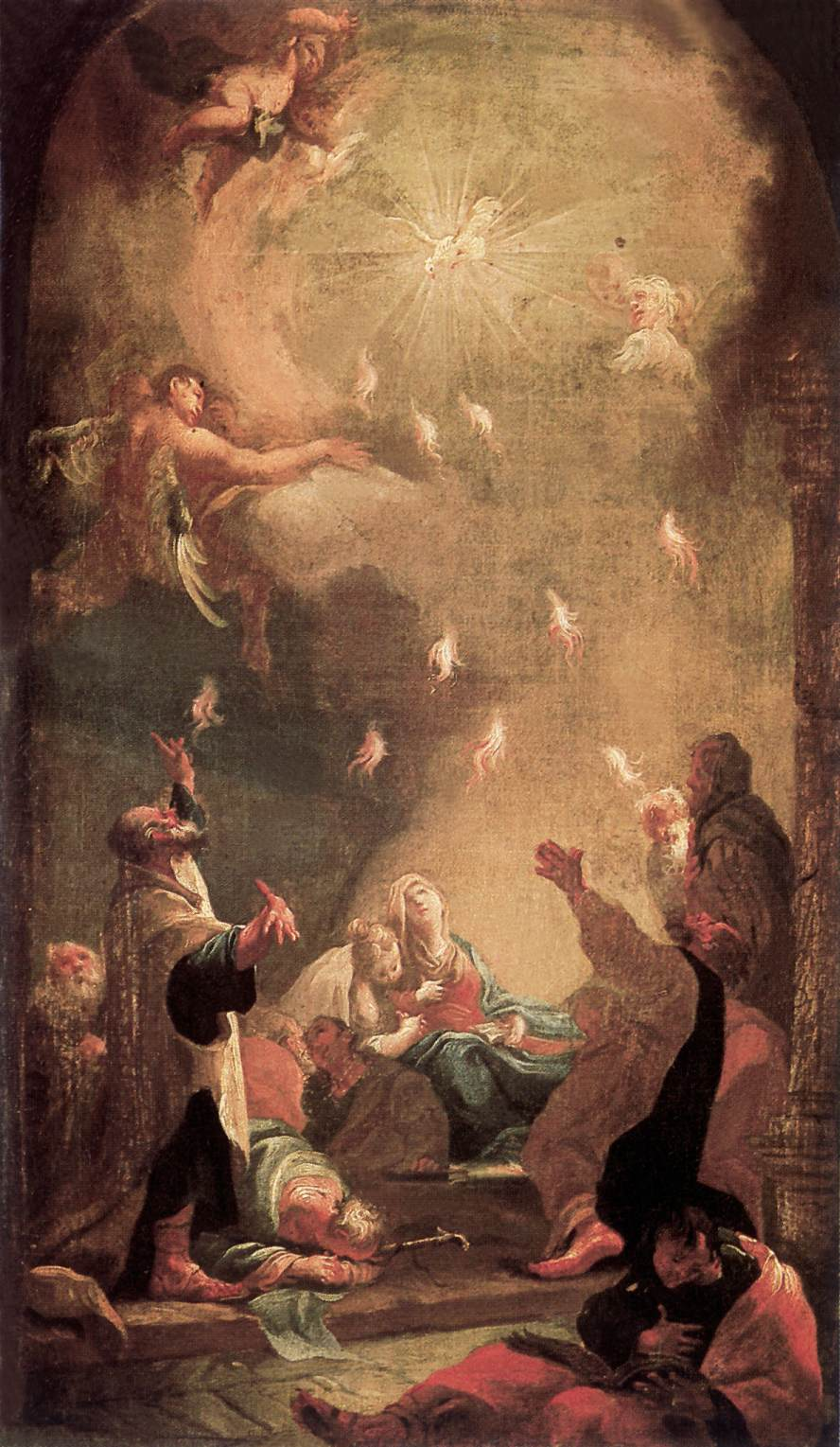
1782: The Pentecost Miracle

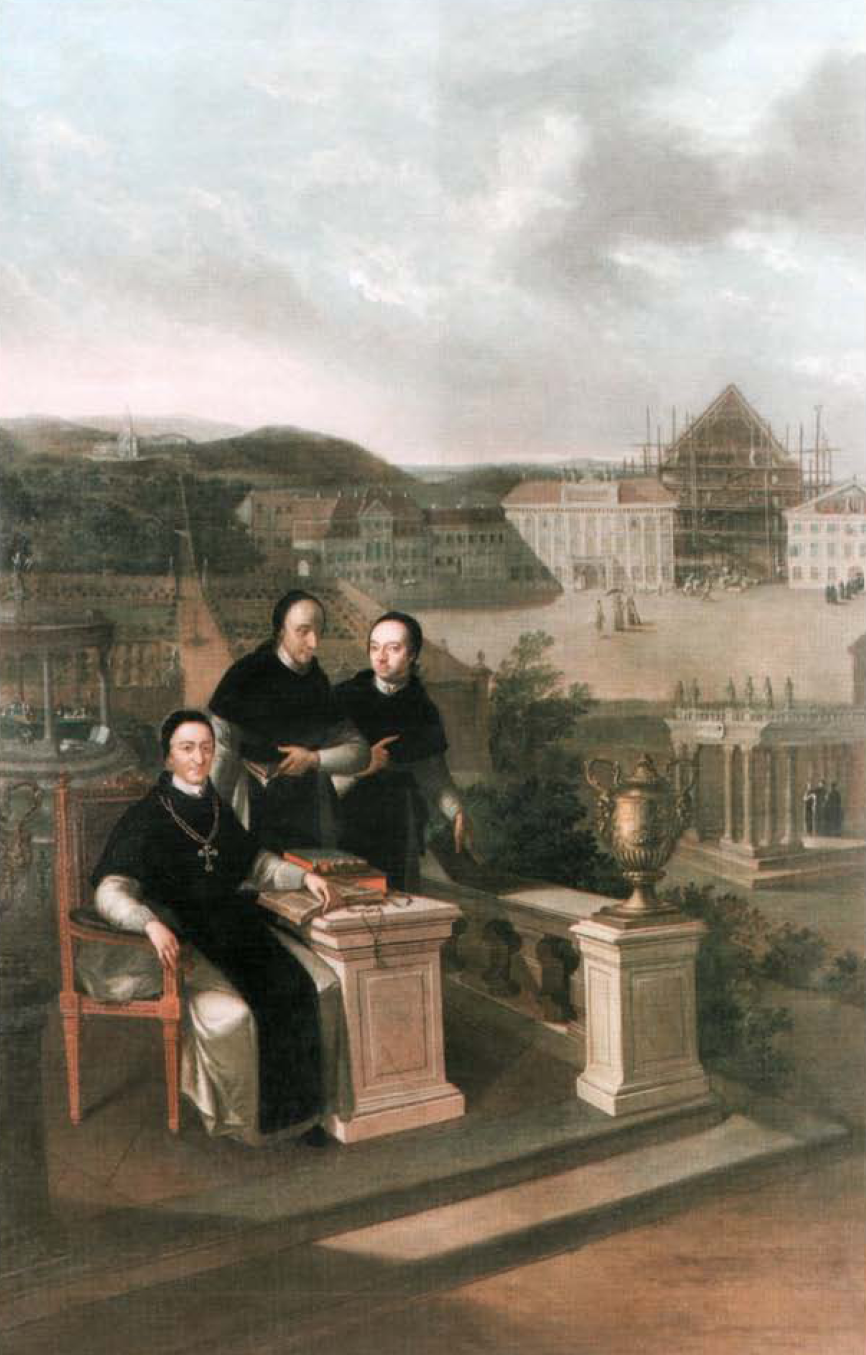
1794–95: Abbott Marian Reutter with the Lyceum teachers of Steinamanger

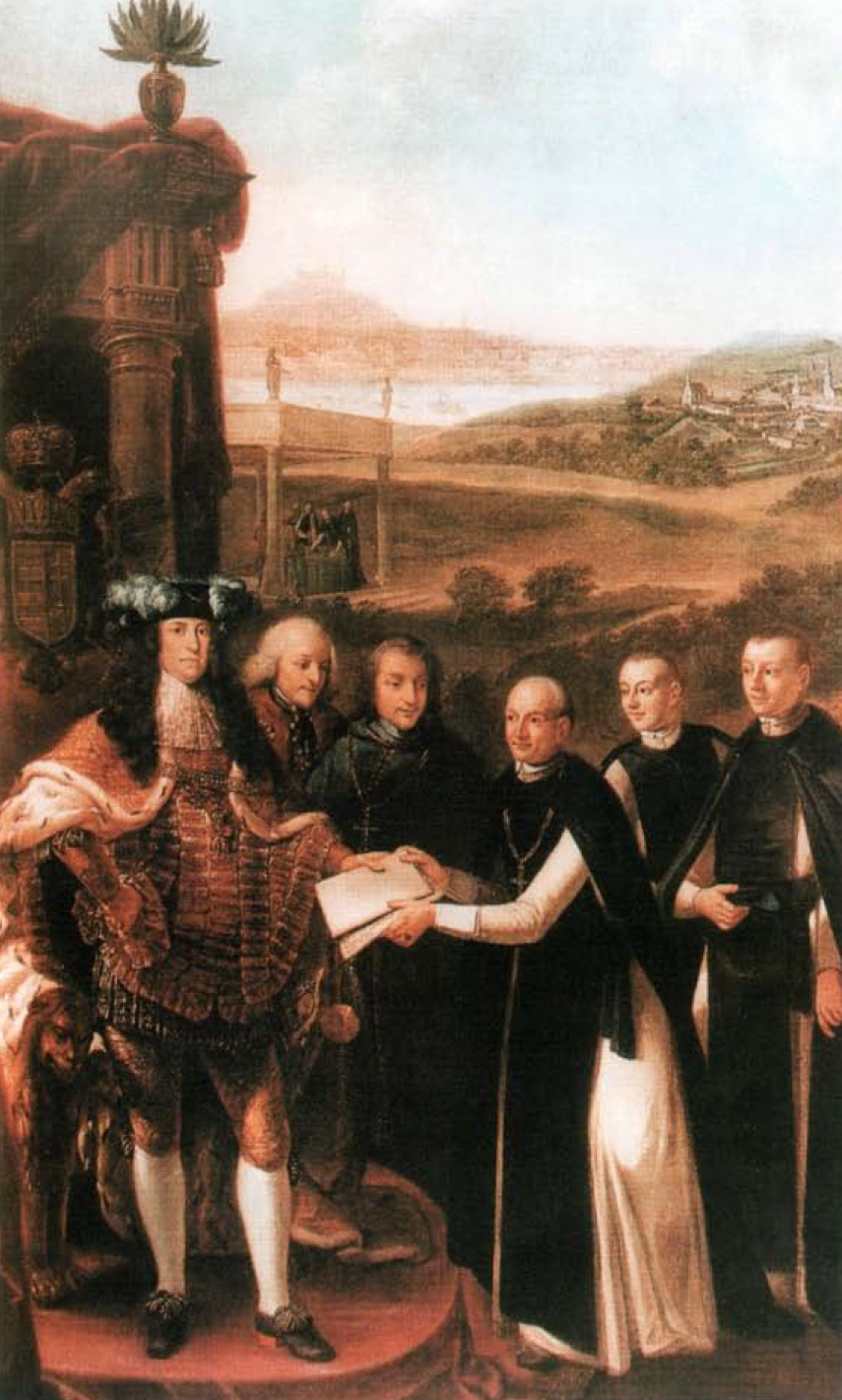
1795–96: Kaiser Karl VI with Abbott Robert Leeb in Sankt Gotthard

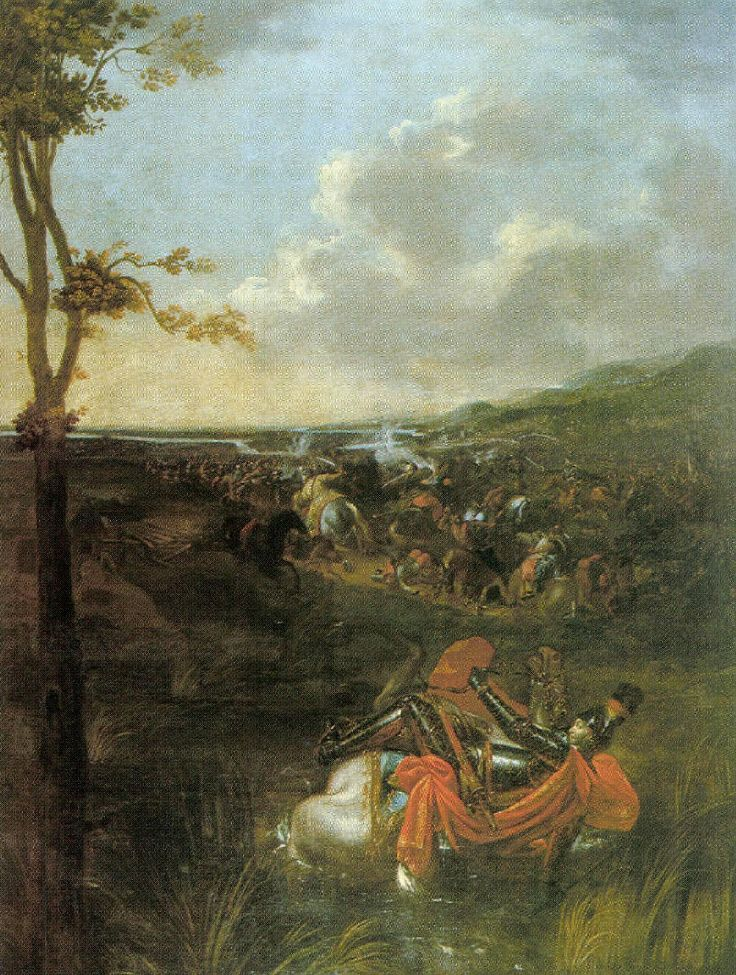
1795–96: The Death of Louis II at the Battle of Mohacs

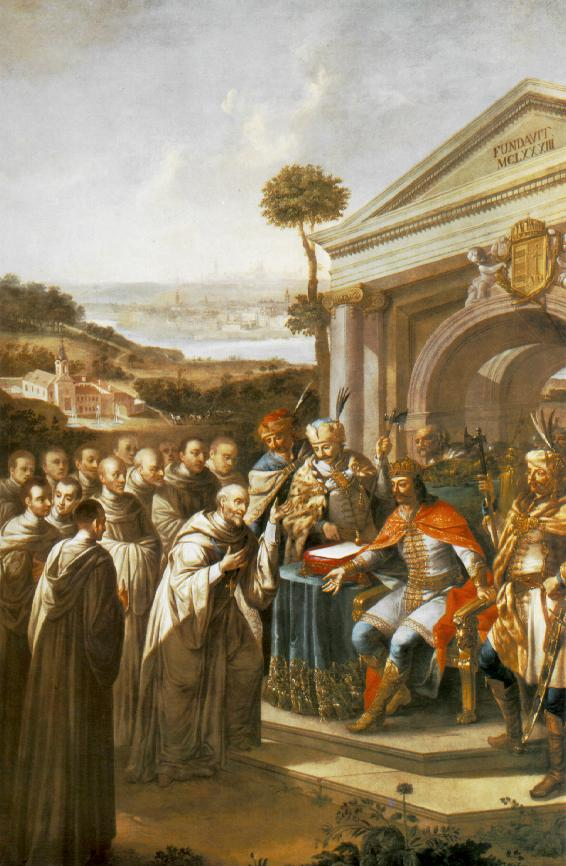
1796: King Béla III, founding the Cistercian monastery of Sankt Gotthard
