= Dampierre-le-Château =

- Commune
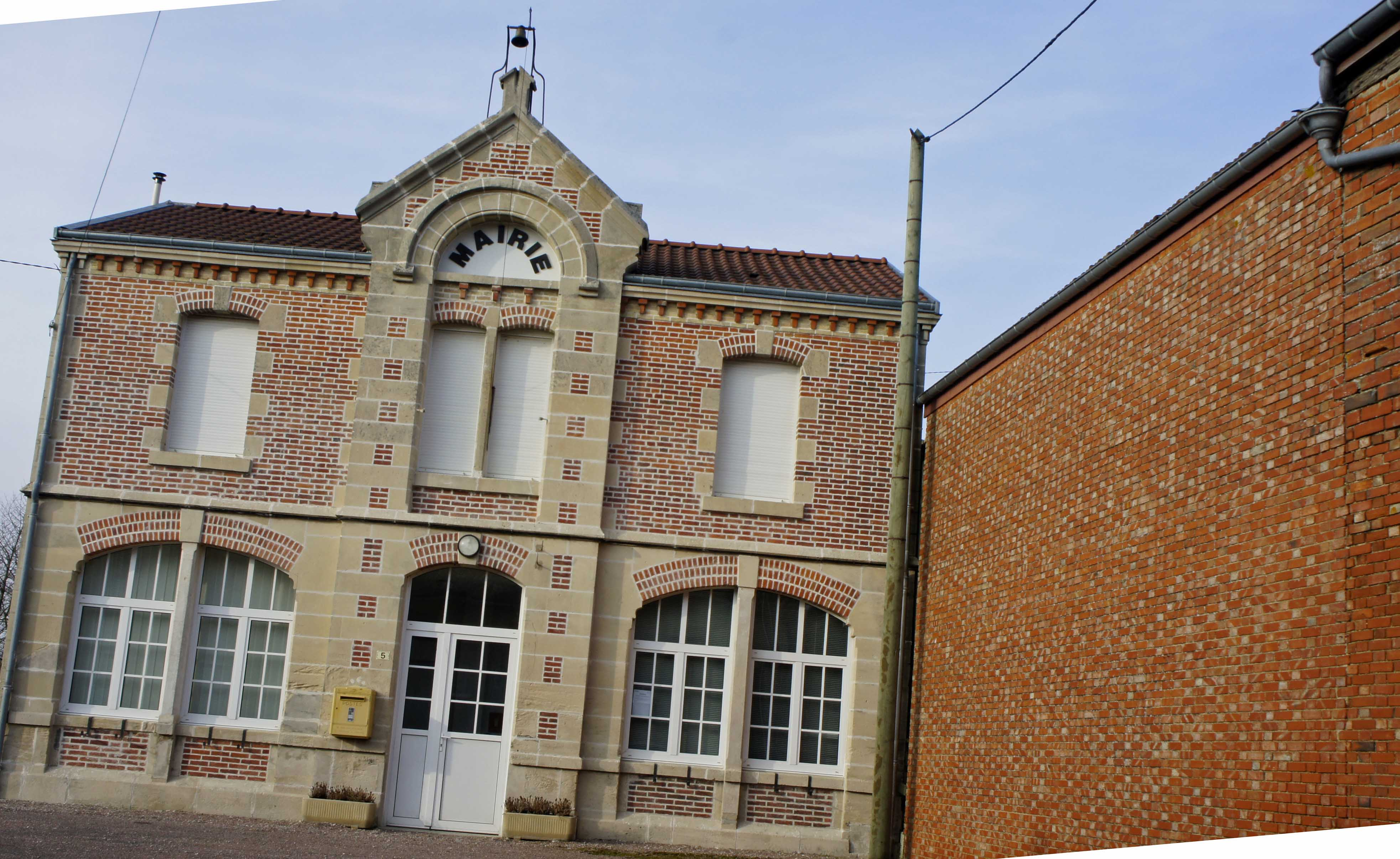
- The town hall in Dampierre-le-Château
- Location of Dampierre-le-Château
- Location within France Location within Grand Est
- Coordinates: 49°00′37″N 4°47′47″E
- Country: France
- Region: Grand Est
- Department: Marne
- Arrondissement: Châlons-en-Champagne
- Canton: Argonne Suippe et Vesle
- Intercommunality: Argonne Champenoise

Government
  - Mayor (2020–2026): Maxime Dausseur
- Area^{1}: 11.13 km^{2} (4.30 sq mi)
- Elevation: 175 m (574 ft)
- Population (2023): 112
  - Density: 10.1/km^{2} (26.1/sq mi)
- Time zone: UTC+01:00 (CET)
  - Summer (DST): UTC+02:00 (CEST)
- INSEE/Postal code: 51206 /51330
- ^{1} French Land Register data, which excludes lakes, ponds, glaciers > 1 km^{2} (0.386 sq mi or 247 acres) and river estuaries.

Dampierre-le-Château (French pronunciation: [dɑ̃pjɛʁləʃɑto]) is a commune of the Marne department in the Grand Est region of France. It is located on the Yèvre river.

== History ==
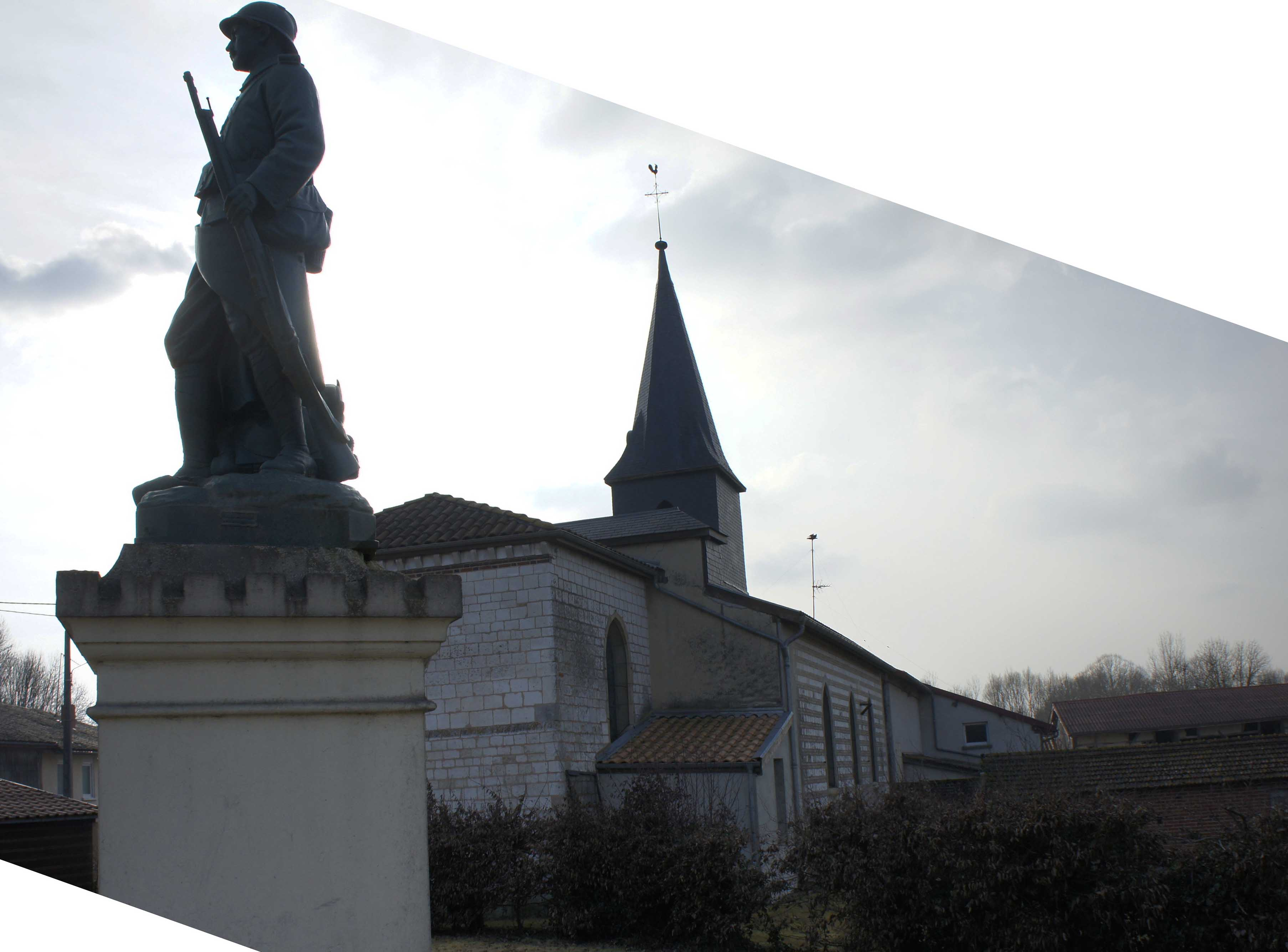
Monument aux Morts and church

Before the French Revolution, it was called "Dampierre-en-Astenois". It was renamed "Dampierre-sur-Yèvre" in 1793, and eventually "Dampierre-le-Château" in 1801.

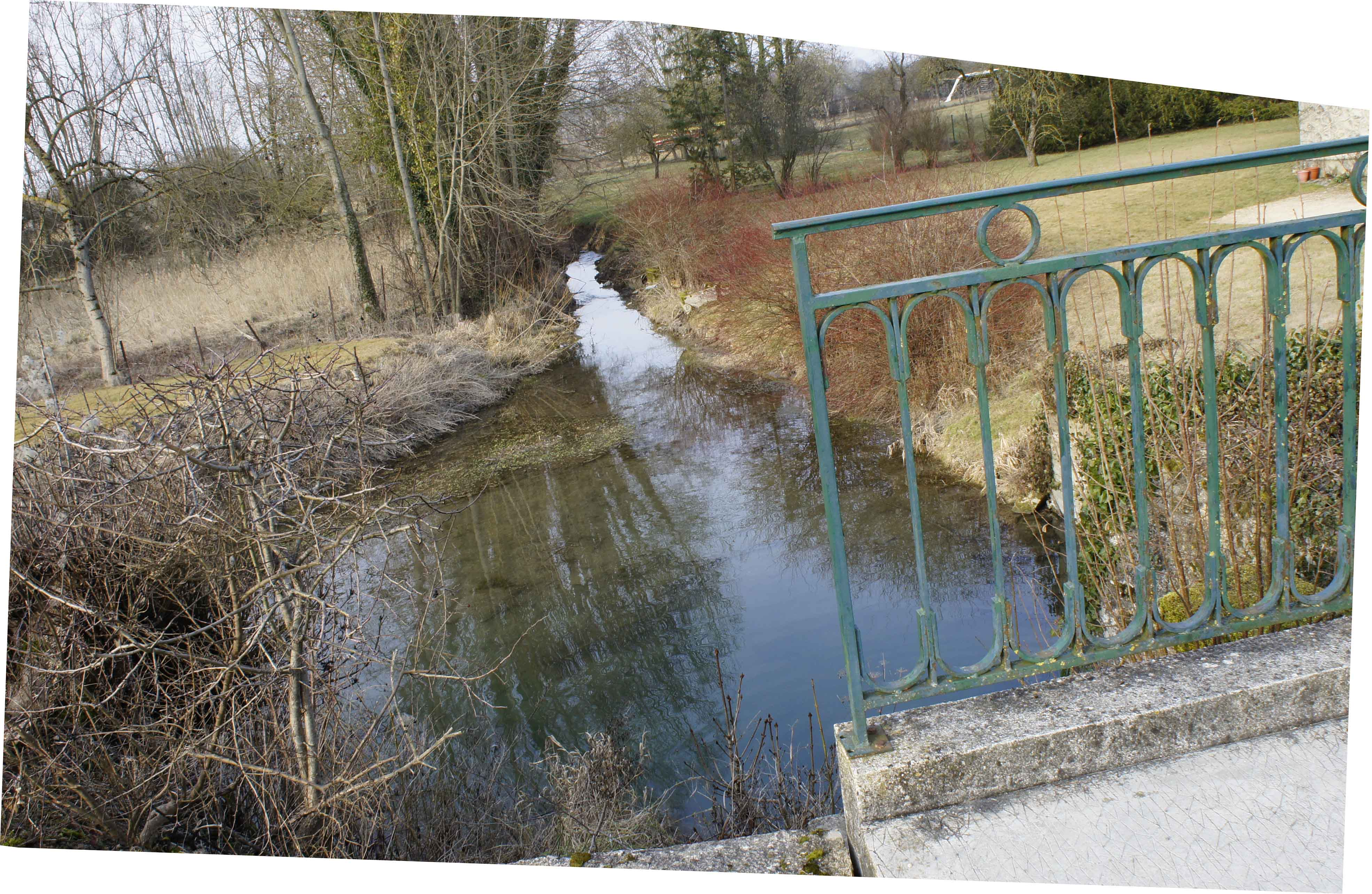
The Yèvre at Dampierre-le-Château

== See also ==
- Communes of the Marne department
