= Épense =

- Commune
- Location of Épense
- Location within France Location within Grand Est
- Coordinates: 48°58′18″N 4°50′04″E
- Country: France
- Region: Grand Est
- Department: Marne
- Arrondissement: Châlons-en-Champagne
- Canton: Argonne Suippe et Vesle

Government
  - Mayor (2020–2026): Myriam Ricarde
- Area^{1}: 11.32 km^{2} (4.37 sq mi)
- Elevation: 160 m (520 ft)
- Population (2023): 117
  - Density: 10.3/km^{2} (26.8/sq mi)
- Time zone: UTC+01:00 (CET)
  - Summer (DST): UTC+02:00 (CEST)
- INSEE/Postal code: 51229 /51330
- ^{1} French Land Register data, which excludes lakes, ponds, glaciers > 1 km^{2} (0.386 sq mi or 247 acres) and river estuaries.

Épense (French pronunciation: [epɑ̃s]) is a commune in the Marne department in north-eastern France.

== Population ==
Historical population
| Year | Pop. | ±% p.a. |
|---|---|---|
| 1968 | 130 | — |
| 1975 | 100 | −3.68% |
| 1982 | 98 | −0.29% |
| 1990 | 92 | −0.79% |
| 1999 | 85 | −0.88% |
| 2007 | 98 | +1.79% |
| 2012 | 117 | +3.61% |
| 2017 | 124 | +1.17% |
| 2023 | 117 | −0.96% |
Source: INSEE

== See also ==
- Communes of the Marne department
