= Châtrices =

- Commune
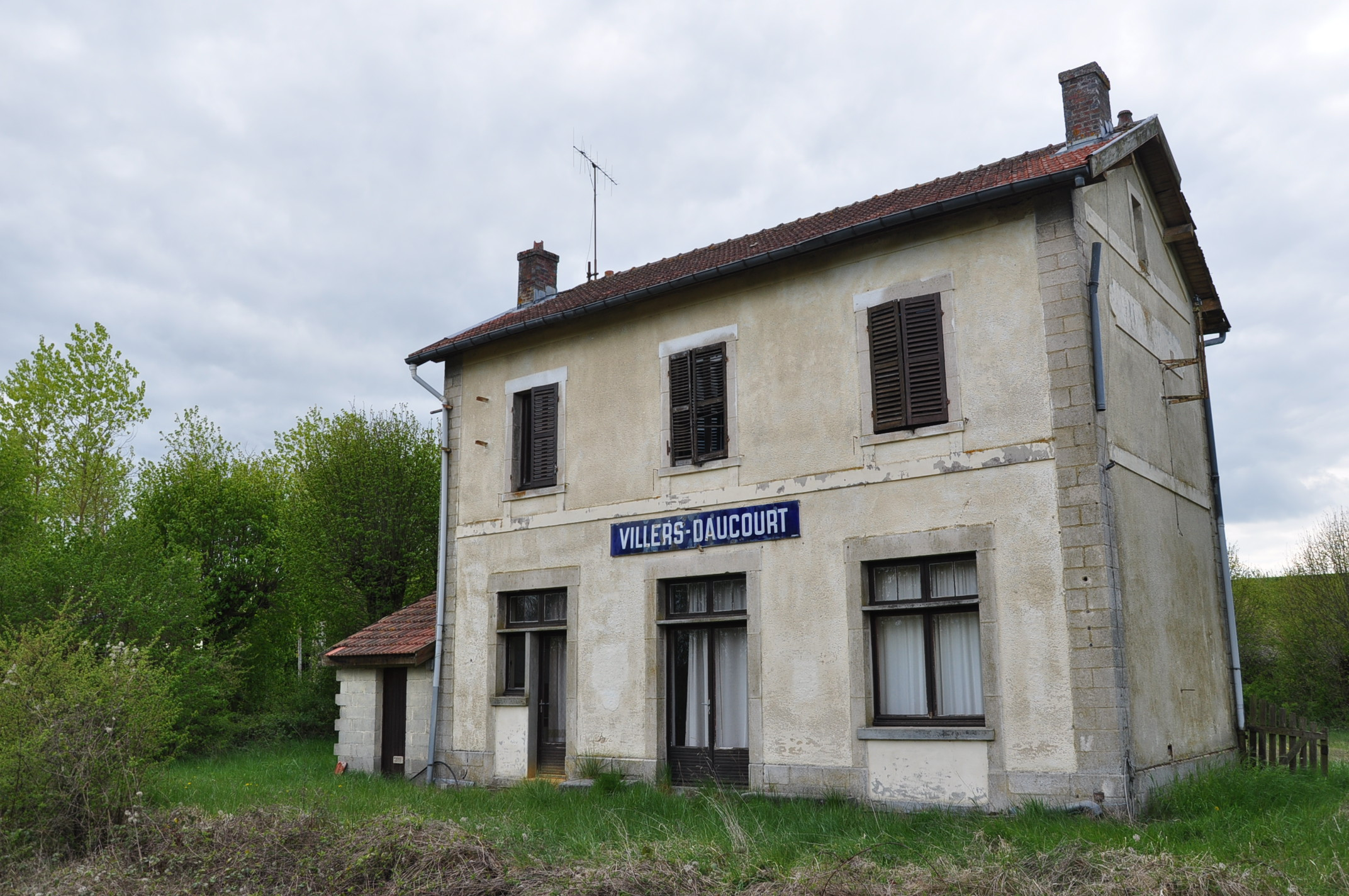
- The former railway station in Châtrices

- Coat of arms
- Location of Châtrices
- Location within France Location within Grand Est
- Coordinates: 49°02′20″N 4°56′20″E
- Country: France
- Region: Grand Est
- Department: Marne
- Arrondissement: Châlons-en-Champagne
- Canton: Argonne Suippe et Vesle
- Intercommunality: Argonne Champenoise

Government
  - Mayor (2020–2026): Jean Notat
- Area^{1}: 19.53 km^{2} (7.54 sq mi)
- Elevation: 148 m (486 ft)
- Population (2023): 36
  - Density: 1.8/km^{2} (4.8/sq mi)
- Time zone: UTC+01:00 (CET)
  - Summer (DST): UTC+02:00 (CEST)
- INSEE/Postal code: 51138 /51800
- ^{1} French Land Register data, which excludes lakes, ponds, glaciers > 1 km^{2} (0.386 sq mi or 247 acres) and river estuaries.

Châtrices (French pronunciation: [ʃatʁis]) is a commune in the Marne department in north-eastern France.

== See also ==
- Communes of the Marne department
