= Remicourt, Marne =

Remicourt
- Commune
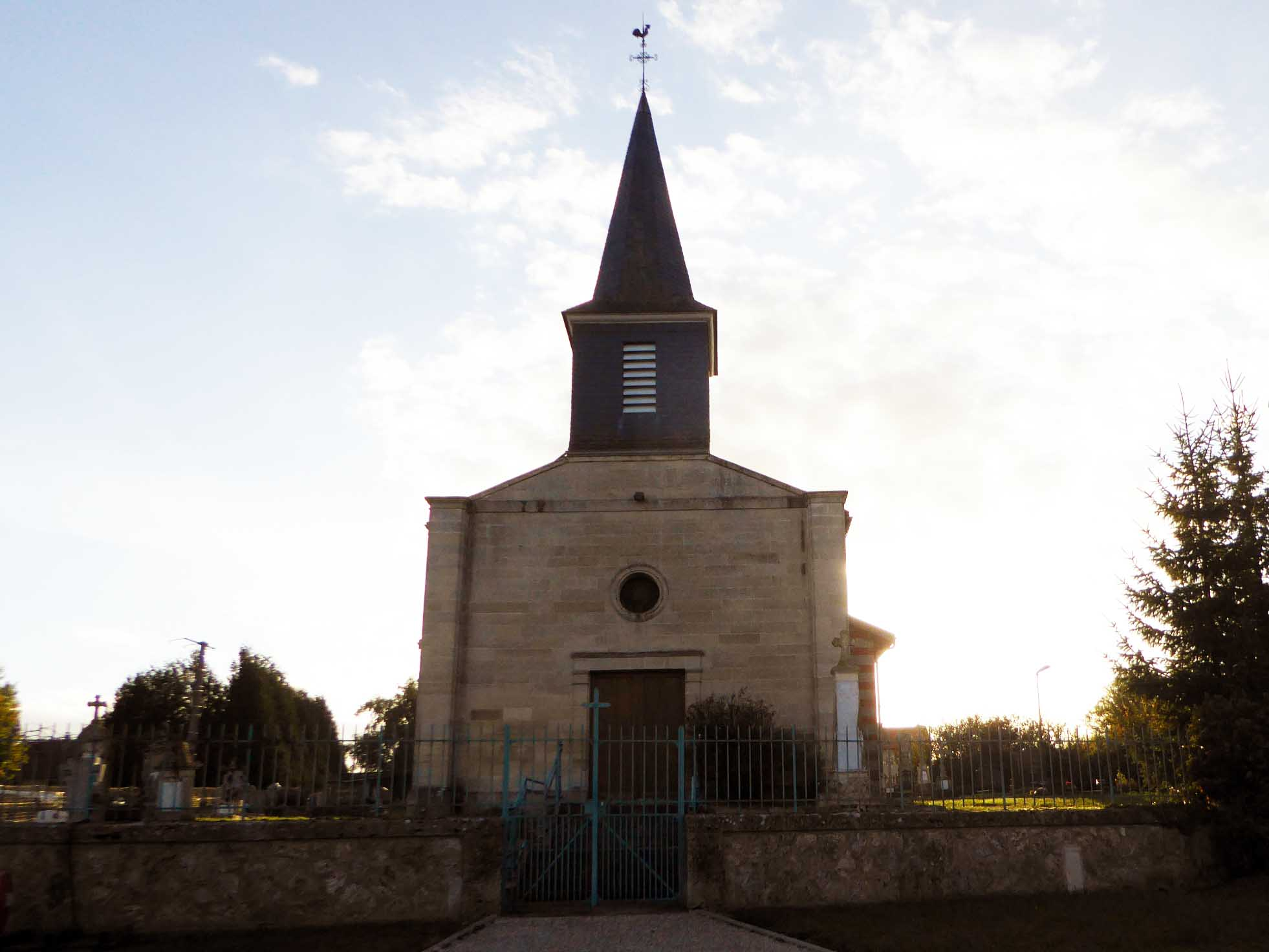
- The church in Remicourt
- Location of Remicourt
- Location within France Location within Grand Est
- Coordinates: 48°57′07″N 4°52′33″E
- Country: France
- Region: Grand Est
- Department: Marne
- Arrondissement: Châlons-en-Champagne
- Canton: Argonne Suippe et Vesle
- Intercommunality: Argonne Champenoise

Government
  - Mayor (2020–2026): Richard Rokitowsky
- Area^{1}: 9.37 km^{2} (3.62 sq mi)
- Elevation: 167 m (548 ft)
- Population (2023): 58
  - Density: 6.2/km^{2} (16/sq mi)
- Time zone: UTC+01:00 (CET)
  - Summer (DST): UTC+02:00 (CEST)
- INSEE/Postal code: 51456 /51330
- ^{1} French Land Register data, which excludes lakes, ponds, glaciers > 1 km^{2} (0.386 sq mi or 247 acres) and river estuaries.

Remicourt is a commune in the Marne department in north-eastern France.

== See also ==
- Communes of the Marne department
