= Le Vieil-Dampierre =

- Commune
- Location of Le Vieil-Dampierre
- Location within France Location within Grand Est
- Coordinates: 48°58′56″N 4°53′17″E
- Country: France
- Region: Grand Est
- Department: Marne
- Arrondissement: Châlons-en-Champagne
- Canton: Argonne Suippe et Vesle

Government
  - Mayor (2020–2026): Claude Dommartin
- Area^{1}: 13.78 km^{2} (5.32 sq mi)
- Elevation: 157 m (515 ft)
- Population (2023): 102
  - Density: 7.40/km^{2} (19.2/sq mi)
- Time zone: UTC+01:00 (CET)
  - Summer (DST): UTC+02:00 (CEST)
- INSEE/Postal code: 51619 /51330
- ^{1} French Land Register data, which excludes lakes, ponds, glaciers > 1 km^{2} (0.386 sq mi or 247 acres) and river estuaries.

Le Vieil-Dampierre (French pronunciation: [lə vjɛj dɑ̃pjɛʁ]) is a commune in the Marne department in north-eastern France.

== See also ==
- Communes of the Marne department
