= Turra (surname) =

Turra is a surname. Notable people with the surname include:

- Antonio Turra (1730–1796), Italian physician and botanist
- Elisabetta Caminèr Turra (1751–1796), Italian writer, and wife of Antonio Turra
- José Turra, Chilean boxer
- Paulo Turra (born 1973), Brazilian football coach and player
