= Roworth =

Roworth is a surname. Notable people with the surname include:

- Edward Roworth (1880–1964), South African artist
- Wendy Wassyng Roworth, professor emerita of art history at the University of Rhode Island

== See also ==
- Raworth
- Rowarth
