= Tephrothamnus =

Tephrothamnus is a taxon synonym for two genera of flowering plants:

- Tephrothamnus Sch.Bip., a synonym of Critoniopsis Sch.Bip.
- Tephrothamnus Sweet ex Hiern, a synonym of Argyrolobium Eckl. & Zeyh.
