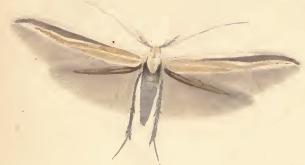

Scientific classification
- Kingdom: Animalia
- Phylum: Arthropoda
- Clade: Pancrustacea
- Class: Insecta
- Order: Lepidoptera
- Family: Coleophoridae
- Genus: Coleophora
- Species: C. ditella

Binomial name
- Coleophora ditella Zeller, 1849

Synonyms
- Coleophora anatolica Toll, 1952; Coleophora roessleri Heinemann & Wocke, 1877

= Coleophora ditella =

Species of moth

Coleophora ditella is a moth of the family Coleophoridae. It is found from Germany to the Iberian Peninsula, Italy and Bulgaria.

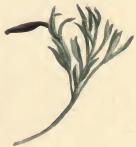
Mined leaf of Artemisia campestris with larva-case attached

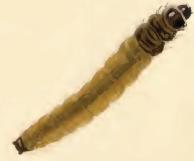
Larva

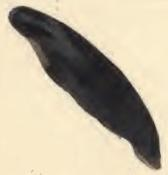
Larval case

The larvae feed on Achillea millefolium, Artemisia alba, Artemisia campestris, Artemisia maritima, Artemisia vulgaris, Aster linosyris, Helichrysum and Tanacetum cinerariifolium. Larvae can be found from September to June.
