= Phyllonorycter triflorella =

Scientific classification
- Domain: Eukaryota
- Kingdom: Animalia
- Phylum: Arthropoda
- Class: Insecta
- Order: Lepidoptera
- Family: Gracillariidae
- Genus: Phyllonorycter
- Species: P. triflorella

Binomial name
- Phyllonorycter triflorella (Peyerimhoff, 1872)

Synonyms
- Lithocolletis triflorella Peyerimhoff, 1872

Species of moth

Phyllonorycter triflorella is a moth of the family Gracillariidae. It is known from France, Corsica, Sardinia, Italy and Croatia.

The larvae feed on Argyrolobium zanonii, Calicotome villosa, Cytisus villosus and Genista sericea. They mine the leaves of their host plant.
