= Christopher M. S. Johns =

American art historian

Christopher M. S. Johns (13 April 1955 – 8 May 2022) was an American art historian, and the Norman L. and Roselea J. Goldberg Professor of History of Art at Vanderbilt University, who specialized in eighteenth-century Italian art, decorative art, material culture, and architecture. He was a leading scholar of early modern Italian art and culture, especially the relationship between art, politics, and religion in eighteenth-century Rome.

== Life ==
Born in Virginia, Johns was raised in Lake City, Florida. He received his BA with summa cum laude from Florida State University where he majored in art history and history. He earned his MA and PhD in art history from the University of Delaware, where he studied with Barbara Maria Stafford. He began his teaching career at the University of Virginia as an assistant professor of art history in 1985. He was the Norman L. and Roselea J. Goldberg Professor of History of Art at Vanderbilt University since 2003, where he served as chair of the Department of History of Art from 2005 to 2009.

He was a member of the organizing committees for the exhibitions "The Splendor of Eighteenth-Century Rome" (Philadelphia Museum of Art and the Museum of Fine Arts, Houston, 2000) and "Art of the Gesù: Bernini and His Age" (Fairfield Museum of Art, 2018), and a member of the consultative committee for the exhibition "Pompeo Batoni" (Palazzo Ducale, Lucca, Italy, 2008–2009).

Recognition of his academic achievements includes numerous visiting professorships, scholarly residences, invitations to lecture in universities and museums around the world, awards and fellowships, most notably from the American Academy in Rome, the Institut für Kunstgeschichte and the Zentralinstitut für Kunstgeschichte in Munich, Samuel H. Kress Foundation, American Council of Learned Societies, the Fulbright Program, and the Center for Advanced Study in Visual Arts at the National Gallery of Art.

Numerous leading scholars have reviewed Johns's books as impactful contributions to such diverse fields as history of early-modern Italian culture, art, and architecture; history of the Catholic Church and the Jesuit order, and Asian art history. In her review of The Visual Culture of Catholic Enlightenment, Wendy Wassyng Roworth wrote that this “groundbreaking" work is "the first comprehensive study to illustrate how progressive papal policies and institutional reforms in the eighteenth century had a direct impact on the visual arts and design.” June Hargrove has called Johns's book Antonio Canova and the Politics of Patronage in Revolutionary and Napoleonic Europe an “instructive study of Canova, his art, and its political context” and “an indispensable history of patronage” that has made “our understanding of the artist and his art … ever the richer.” John Pinto wrote that Johns's first monograph, Papal Art and Cultural Politics: Rome in the Age of Clement XI, is an important contribution to the history of art and to the study of eighteenth-century Rome.”

Through his scholarship, teaching, and service to the discipline, he was a central figure in transforming and developing the field of eighteenth-century art. He was a founding member of the Historians of Eighteenth-Century Art and Architecture and the president of the organization from 1994 to 2001.

== Bibliography ==
=== Single authored books ===
- China and the Church: Chinoiserie in Global Context. University of California Press, 2016. ISBN 9780520284654
- The Visual Culture of Catholic Enlightenment. Penn State University Press, 2014. ISBN 978-0-271-06208-2
- Antonio Canova and the Politics of Patronage in Revolutionary and Napoleonic Europe. University of California Press, 1998. ISBN 9780520212015.
  - Finalist for Charles Rufus Morey Book Award, College Art Association of America
- Papal Art and Cultural Politics: Rome in the Age of Clement XI. Cambridge University Press, 1993. ISBN 9780521416399

=== Edited volumes ===
- The Holy Name: Art of the Gesù: Bernini and His Age, volume 17 of Early Modern Catholicism and the Visual Arts, edited by Linda Wolk-Simon, with the collaboration of Christopher M. S. Johns. Saint Joseph's University Press, 2018. ISBN 9780916101008
  - Evening Standard Best Art Books of 2018
- Benedict XIV and the Enlightenment: Art, Science, and Spirituality, co-edited with Rebecca Messbarger and Philip Gavitt. University of Toronto Press, 2016. ISBN 9781442637184

=== Published essays ===
- “Making History at the Capitoline Museum: Maria Tibaldi Subleyras's ‘Christ in the House of Simon the Pharisee,” Eighteenth-Century Studies 52, no. 2 (2018): 167–171.
- “’Upon the roof of heav’n’: Giovanni Battista Gaulli's Dome, Pendentive, and Vault Frescoes at Il Gesù,” in The Holy Name: Art of the Gesù: Bernini and His Age, ed. Linda Wolk-Simon, with the collaboration of Christopher M. S. Johns, Early Modern Catholicism and the Visual Arts, vol. 17 (Philadelphia: Saint Joseph's University Press, 2018), 269-323.
- “The Fortunes of the Society of Jesus: From Ecclesia Triumphans to Dominus ac Redemptor,” in The Holy Name: Art of the Gesù: Bernini and His Age, ed. Linda Wolk-Simon, with the collaboration of Christopher M. S. Johns, Early Modern Catholicism and the Visual Arts, vol. 17 (Philadelphia: Saint Joseph's University Press, 2018), 33–60.
- “Chinoiserie in Piedmont: An International Language of Diplomacy and Modernity,” in Turin and the British in the Age of the Grand Tour, ed. Karin E. Wolfe and Paola Bianchi (Cambridge and London: Cambridge University Press and the British School at Rome, 2017), 281–300.
- “Introduction: The Scholar's Pope: Benedict XIV and Catholic Enlightenment,” in Benedict XIV and the Enlightenment: Art, Science, and Spirituality, ed. Rebecca Messbarger, Christopher M. S. Johns, and Philip Gavitt (Toronto: University of Toronto Press, 2016), 3–14.
- “Caffeine Culture and Papal Diplomacy: Benedict XIV's ‘Caffeaus’ in the Quirinal Gardens,” in Benedict XIV and the Enlightenment: Art, Science, and Spirituality, ed. Rebecca Messbarger, Christopher M. S. Johns, and Philip Gavitt (Toronto: University of Toronto Press, 2016), 367-387.
- “Erotic Spirituality and the Catholic Revival in Napoleonic Paris: The Curious History of Antonio Canova's ‘Penitent Magdalene’,’’ Studies in Eighteenth-Century Culture 42 (2013): 1-20.
- “Visual Culture and the Triumph of Cosmopolitanism in Eighteenth-Century Rome,” in Roma Britannica: Art Patronage and Cultural Exchange in Eighteenth-Century Rome, ed. David Marshall, Karin E. Wolfe, and Sue Russell, (London and Rome: The British School at Rome, 2011), 13–21.
- "Travel and Cultural Exchange in Enlightenment Rome," in Cultural Contact and the Making of European Art since the Age of Exploration, ed. Mary D. Sheriff (Chapel Hill, N.C.: University of North Carolina Press, 2010): 73–96.
- “The ‘Good Bishop’ of Catholic Enlightenment: Benedict XIV's Gifts to the Metropolitan Cathedral of Bologna,” The Court Historian 14 (2009): 149-160.
- "Gender and Genre in the Religious Art of the Catholic Enlightenment," in Italy's Eighteenth Century: Gender and Culture in the Age of the Grand Tour, ed. Paula Findlen, Wendy Wassyng Roworth, and Catherine Sama (Stanford, California: Stanford University Press, 2008), 331–45; 451–55.
- “Exhibition Review: Pompeo Batoni: Prince of Painters in Eighteenth-Century Rome,” Burlington Magazine 150 (April 2008): 269–270.
- "The Roman Experience of Jacques-Louis David, 1775-1780,” in Jacques-Louis David: New Perspectives, ed. Dorothy Johnson (Newark, Delaware and London: University of Delaware Press, 2006), 58–70.
- “Papa Albani and Francesco Bianchini: Intellectual and Visual Culture in Early Eighteenth-Century Rome,” in Francesco Bianchini (1662-1729) und die europäische gelehrte Welt um 1700, ed. Valentin Kockel and Brigitte Sölch. Colloquia Augustana, vol. 21 (Berlin: Akademie Verlag, 2005), 41–55.
- "Portraiture and the Making of National Identity: Pompeo Batoni's 'The Honourable Colonel William Gordon’ (1765–66) in Italy and North Britain," Art History 27 (2004): 382-411.
- "The Empress Josephine's Collection of Sculpture by Antonio Canova at Malmaison," Journal of the History of Collections 16 (2004): 19–33.
- "'An Ornament of Italy and the Premier Female Painter of Europe': Rosalba Carriera and the Roman Academy," in Women, Art, and the Politics of Identity in Eighteenth-Century Europe, ed. Melissa Hyde and Jennifer Milam (London: Ashgate, 2003), 20–45.
- “Proslavery Rhetoric and Classical Authority: Antonio Canova's ‘George Washington’,” Memoirs of the American Academy in Rome 47 (2003): 119-150.
- "The Conceptualization of Form and the Modern Sculptural Masterpiece: Canova's Drawings for 'Venus Italica'," Master Drawings 41 (2003): 128–139.
- "The Entrepôt of Europe: Rome in the Eighteenth Century," in Art in Rome in the Eighteenth Century, ed. Joseph J. Rishel and Edgar Peters Bowron (Philadelphia and London: Merrell Hoberton, 2000), 17–46.
- "Ecclesiastical Politics and Papal Tombs: Antonio Canova's Monuments to Clement XIV and Clement XIII," The Sculpture Journal 2 (1998): 58–71.
- "'That Amiable Object of Adoration': Pompeo Batoni and the Sacred Heart," Gazette des Beaux-Arts 132 (1998): 19–28.
- "Subversion through Historical Association: Canova's Madame Mère and the Politics of Napoleonic Portraiture," Word & Image 13 (1997): 43–57.
- "Venetian Eighteenth-Century Art and the Status Quo," review of the exhibition 'The Glory of Venice'," Washington, D.C., National Gallery of Art, Eighteenth-Century Studies 28 (1995): 427-428.
- "Portrait Mythology: Antonio Canova's Representations of the Bonapartes," Eighteenth-Century Studies 28 (1994): 115–129.
- "Art and Science in Eighteenth-Century Bologna: Donato Creti's Astronomical Landscape Paintings," Zeitschrift für Kunstgeschichte 55 (1992): 578–589.
- "Re-framing Art History: Text and Context," Eighteenth-Century Studies 26 (1992): 517–522.
- "French Connections to Papal Art and Politics in the Rome of Clement XI, 1700-1721," Storia dell'Arte 67 (1990): 279–285.
- Co-authored with Steven F. Ostrow, "Illuminations of S. Maria Maggiore in the Early Settecento," Burlington Magazine 123 (1990): 528–534.
- "Antonio Canova and Austrian Art Policy," in Austria in the Age of the French Revolution, ed. Kinley Brauer and William E. Wright (Minneapolis: University of Minnesota Press, 1990), 83–90.
- "Antonio Canova's 'Napoleon as Mars': Nudity and Mixed Genre in Neoclassical Portraiture," Proceedings of the Consortium on Revolutionary Europe, 1750-1850 (1990): 368–382.
- "Antonio Canova's Drawings for 'Hercules and Lichas'," Master Drawings 27 (1989): 358–367.
- "Papal Patronage and Cultural Bureaucracy in Eighteenth-Century Rome: Clement XI and the Accademia di San Luca," Eighteenth-Century Studies 22 (1988): 1-23.
- "Politics, Nationalism, and Friendship in Van Dyck's 'Le Roi à la Ciasse'," Zeitschrift für Kunstgeschichte 51 (1988): 243–261.
- "Clement XI, Carlo Fontana, and Santa Maria Maggiore in the Early Eighteenth Century," Journal of the Society of Architectural Historians 45 (1986): 286–293.
- "Some Observations on Collaboration and Patronage in the Altieri Chapel, San Francesco a Ripa: Bernini and Gaulli," Storia dell'Arte 50 (1984): 43–47.
- "Theater and Theory: Thomas Sully's 'George Frederick Cooke as Richard III'," Winterthur Portfolio 18 (1983): 27–38.

=== Exhibition catalogue entries ===
- In The Holy Name: Art of the Gesù: Bernini and His Age, ed. Linda Wolk-Simon, with the collaboration of Christopher M. S. Johns. Early Modern Catholicism and the Visual Arts, vol. 17. (Philadelphia: Saint Joseph's University Press, 2018):
  - "Giovanni Battista Gaulli," pp. 432–437; 498–501; 504–509
  - "Gianlorenzo Bernini," pp. 510–513
  - "Filippo Copranese," pp. 542–543.
- In Art in Rome in the Eighteenth Century, ed. Joseph J. Rishel and Edgar Peters Bowron (Philadelphia and London, 2000)
  - "Antonio Canova," pp. 234–239
  - "Giuseppe Chiari," pp. 345–348
  - "Sebastiano Conca," pp. 348 and 492–493
  - "Francesco Trevisani," pp. 441–446

=== Encyclopedia entries ===
- “David, Jacques-Louis,” in The Classical Tradition, ed. Anthony Grafton, Glenn Most, and Salvatore Settis (Cambridge, Mass.: Harvard University Press, 2010), 252–253.
- "Neoclassicism, [4: 264-68]," "Canova, Antonio, [1: 376-378]," and "Mengs, Anton Raphael [4: 94-96]," in Europe 1450 to 1789: Encyclopedia of the Early Modern World, ed. John Dewald, 6 vols. (New York: Charles Scribner's Sons, 2004).
- "Benincampi, Teresa." in Dictionary of Women Artists, ed. Delia Gaze, (London, 1997), 243–44.
- "Bertotti Scamozzi, Ottavio," in The Macmillan Encyclopedia of Architects, 4 vols. (New York, 1982), 1: 203–204.

=== Book reviews ===
- Review for David Bindman, Warm Flesh, Cold Marble: Canova, Thorvaldsen and Their Critics (New Haven and London: Yale University Press, 2014), in The Sculpture Journal 24 (2015): 117–119.
- Review for Tommaso Manfredi, Filippo Juvarra: Gli anni giovanili (Rome: Argos, 2010), in Palladio 51 (2013): 134–136.
- Review for Carole Paul, The Borghese Collections and the Display of Art in the Age of the Grand Tour (Aldershot, England: Ashgate Publishing, 2008), in Burlington Magazine 152 (2010): 480–481.
- Review for Nigel Aston, Art and Religion in Eighteenth-Century Europe (London: Reaktion Books, 2009), in Sehepunkte: Rezensionsjournal für die Geschichtswissenschaften Sehepunkte 10 (June 15, 2010).
- Review for Susan Vandiver Nicassio, Imperial City: Rome, Romans, and Napoleon, 1796-1815 (Welwyn Garden city, England: Ravenhall Books, 2005), in Journal of Modern History 80 (2008): 688–690.
- Review for Jeffrey Collins, Papacy and Politics in Eighteenth-Century Rome: Pius VI and the Arts (Cambridge and New York: Cambridge University Press, 2004), in Eighteenth-Century Studies 39 (2006): 561–564.
- Review for Steffi Roettgen, Anton Raphael Mengs, 1728-1779, 2 vols. (Munich: Hirmer, 1999–2003), in Kunstkronik 59 (2006): 400–404.
- Review for Elisabeth Kieven and John Pinto, Pietro Bracci and Eighteenth-Century Rome (University Park, Pa., and Montréal: Pennsylvania State University Press and Canadian Centre for Architecture, 2001), in Master Drawings 41 (2003): 174–176.
- Review for Matthias Vögel, Johann Heinrich Füssli: Darsteller der Leidenschaft (Zürich: InterPublishers, 2001), in Master Drawings 41 (2003): 74–75.
- Review for Per Bjurström, Nicolas Pio as a Collector of Drawings (Stockholm: Suecoromana II, 1995), in Master Drawings 40 (2002): 262–264.
- Review for John J. Ciofalo, The Self-Portraits of Francisco Goya (Cambridge and New York: Cambridge University Press, 2001), in CAA On-Line Reviews (April 26, 2001).
- Review for William St. Claire, Lord Elgin and the Marbles: The Controversial History of the Parthenon Sculptures (Oxford: Oxford University Press, 1998), in Eighteenth-Century Studies 34 (2000): 309–311.
- Review for Shearer West, ed., Italian Culture in Northern Europe in the Eighteenth Century (Cambridge and New York: Cambridge University Press, 1999), in CAA On-Line Reviews (October 4, 1999).
- Review for Paula Rea Radisich, Hubert Robert: Painted Spaces of the Enlightenment (Cambridge and New York: Cambridge University Press, 1999), in CAA On-Line Reviews (May 14, 1999).
- Review for James David Draper and Guilhem Scherf, Augustin Pajou: Dessinateur en Italie, 1752-1756 (Paris: Librairie des Arts et Métiers-Éditions Jacques Laget, 1997), in Master Drawings 37 (1999): 69–70.
- Review for Petra Lamers, Il viaggio nel Sud dell'Abbé de Saint-Non (Naples: Electa Napoli, 1995), in Master Drawings 36 (1998): 313–315.
- Review for David Bindman and Malcolm Baker, Roubiliac and the Eighteenth-Century Monument: Sculpture as Theatre (New Haven and London: Yale University Press, 1995) and Marie Busco, Sir Richard Westmacott: Sculptor (Cambridge and New York: Cambridge University Press, 1995), in Art Bulletin 78 (1996): 565–568.
- Review for Elisabeth Kieven, ed., Ferdinando Fuga e l'architettura del Settecento (Florence: De Luca Editrice, 1988), in Journal of the Society of Architectural Historians 50 (1991): 324–325.
- Review for Hanns Gross, Rome in the Age of Enlightenment (Cambridge and New York: Cambridge University Press, 1990), in Burlington Magazine 133 (1991): 204–205.
- Review for Norma Broude, The Macchiaioli: Italian Painters of the Nineteenth Century (New Haven and London: Yale University Press, 1988), in Italica 67 (1990): 222–224.
- Review for Carolyn Springer, The Marble Wilderness: Ruins and Representations in Italian Romanticism, 1775-1850 (Cambridge and New York: Cambridge University Press, 1988), in Journal of European Ideas 10 (1989): 127–128.
- Review for John Pinto, The Trevi Fountain (New Haven and London: Yale University Press, 1986), in Journal of the Society of Architectural Historians 46 (1987): 184–185.

=== Published translation ===
- Tommaso Manfredi, “Academic Practice and Roman Architecture during the Reign of Benedict XIV,” in Benedict XIV and the Enlightenment: Art, Science, and Spirituality, ed. Rebecca Messbarger, Christopher M. S. Johns, and Philip Gavitt (Toronto: University of Toronto Press, 2016), 439–466. Translated from Italian.
