= Cucullia santonici =

Scientific classification
- Domain: Eukaryota
- Kingdom: Animalia
- Phylum: Arthropoda
- Class: Insecta
- Order: Lepidoptera
- Superfamily: Noctuoidea
- Family: Noctuidae
- Genus: Cucullia
- Species: C. santonici

Binomial name
- Cucullia santonici (Hübner, [1813])

Synonyms
- Noctua santonici Hübner, [1813]; Cucullia odorata Guenée, 1852

Species of moth

Cucullia santonici is a moth of the family Noctuidae. It was traditionally found from southern Europe through parts of Near East and Middle East to China.

Recent observations of its range are greatly reduced. Its western range includes small portions of Eastern Serbia, Northwestern Bulgaria and Western Romania. Its eastern range includes Northeastern Bulgaria, Eastern Romania, Northwestern Moldova & Southwestern Ukraine.

Adults are on wing from April to June and July and August. There are two generations per year.

The larvae feed on Artemisia alba, Artemisia absinthium and probably other Artemisia, Matricaria and Achillea species.
