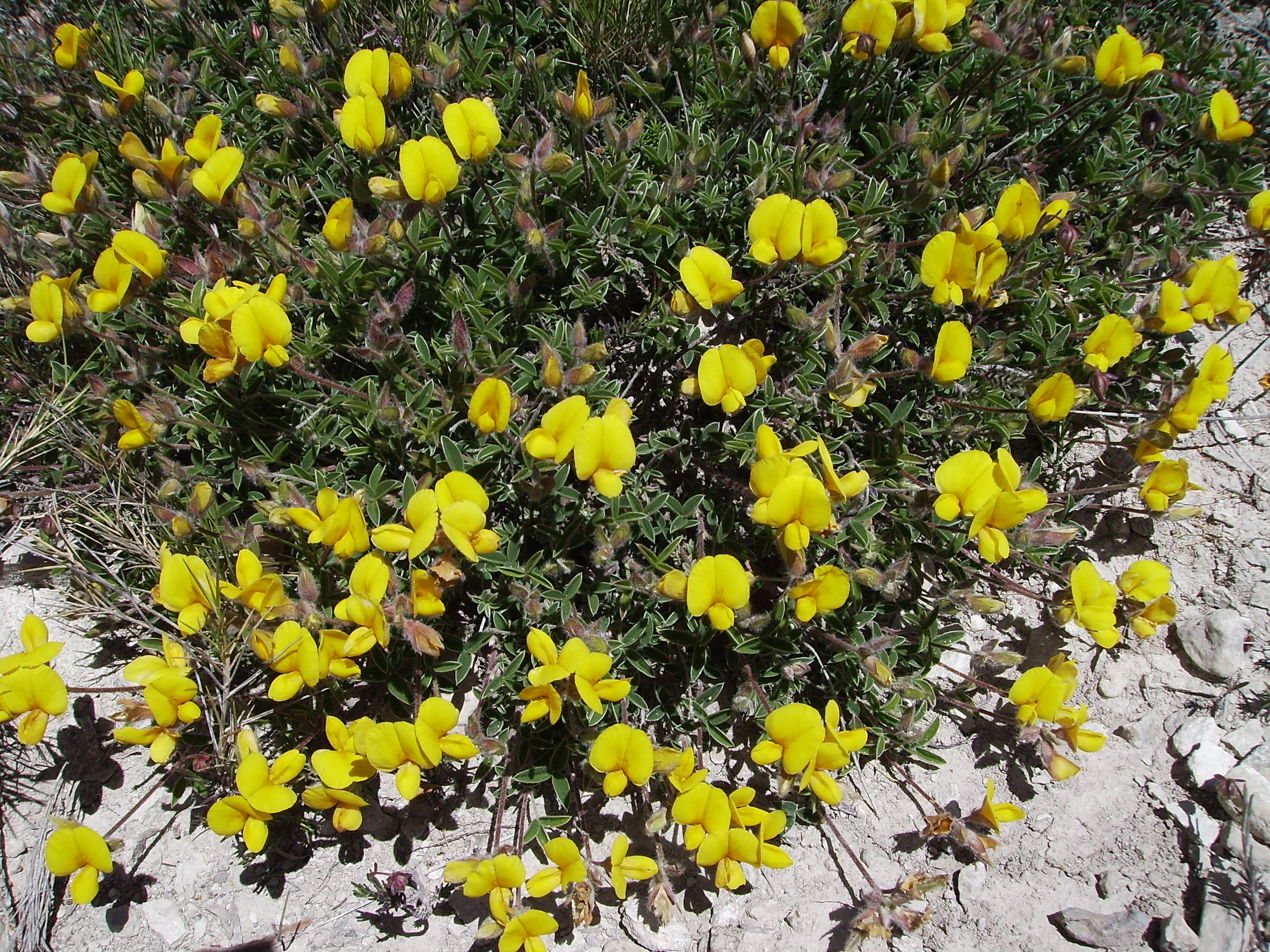
- Argyrolobium zanonii

Scientific classification
- Kingdom: Plantae
- Clade: Tracheophytes
- Clade: Angiosperms
- Clade: Eudicots
- Clade: Rosids
- Order: Fabales
- Family: Fabaceae
- Subfamily: Faboideae
- Tribe: Genisteae
- Genus: Argyrolobium; Eckl. & Zeyh.

Type species
- Argyrolobium argenteum Eckl. & Zeyh. (1836)

Species
- 74–89; see text
- Argyrolobium distribution map.

Synonyms
- Calispepla Vved. (1952); Chasmone E. Mey. (1836); Diotolotus Tausch (1842); Gamochilum Walp. (1839); Lotophyllus Link (1831); Macrolotus Harms (1897); Tephrothamnus Sweet ex Hiern (1896), nom. superfl.; Trichasma Walp. (1840)

= Argyrolobium =

Genus of legumes

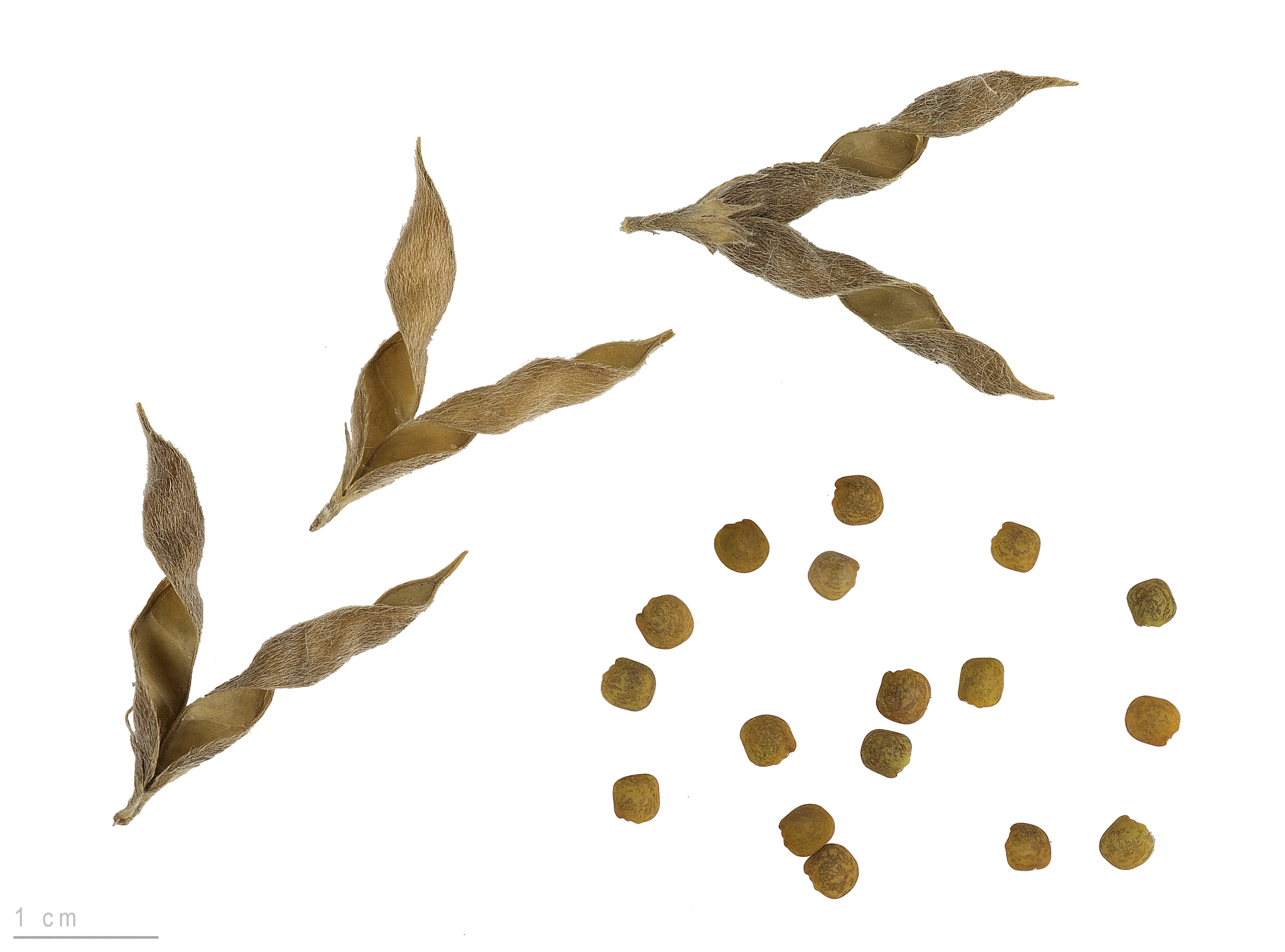
Argyrolobium zanonii - MHNT

Argyrolobium is a genus of flowering plants in the family Fabaceae. It belongs to the subfamily Faboideae. Members of this genus are found in Africa, western and south Asia, and southern Europe.

== Species ==
Argyrolobium comprises the following sections and species:

=== Section Amplexicaule ===
- Argyrolobium amplexicaule (E. Mey.) Dummer
- Argyrolobium crinitum Walp.

=== Section Lunare ===
- Argyrolobium lunare (L.) Druce
  - subsp. lunare
  - subsp. sericeum
- Argyrolobium splendens Walp.

=== Section Transvaalense ===
- Argyrolobium baptisioides Walp.
- Argyrolobium frutescens Burtt Davy
- Argyrolobium longifolium (Meissner) Walp.
- Argyrolobium megarrhizum Bolus
- Argyrolobium muddii Dummer
- Argyrolobium speciosum Eckl. & Zeyh.
  - subsp. speciosum
  - subsp. macrophyllum
- Argyrolobium transvaalense Schinz
- Argyrolobium wilmsii Harms

=== Section Polyphyllum ===
- Argyrolobium crassifolium Eckl. & Zeyh.
- Argyrolobium incanum Eckl. & Zeyh.
- Argyrolobium parviflorum T.J.Edwards
- Argyrolobium polyphyllum Eckl. & Zeyh.
- Argyrolobium tenue (E.Mey.) Walp. (tentatively placed here)
- Argyrolobium trifoliatum (Thunb.) Druce

=== Section Argyrolobium ===
- Argyrolobium adscendens Walp.
- Argyrolobium aciculare Dummer
- Argyrolobium angustissimum (E. Mey.) T.J. Edwards
- Argyrolobium argenteum (N.J. Jacq.) Eckl. & Zeyh.
- Argyrolobium barbatum Walp.
- Argyrolobium campicola Harms
- Argyrolobium candicans Eckl. & Zeyh.
- Argyrolobium collinum Eckl. & Zeyh.
- Argyrolobium filiforme Eckl. & Zeyh.
- Argyrolobium harmsianum Harms
- Argyrolobium harveyanum Oliv.
- Argyrolobium humile E. Phillips
- Argyrolobium lotoides Trautv.
- Argyrolobium marginatum Bolus
- Argyrolobium molle Eckl. & Zeyh.
- Argyrolobium pachyphyllum Schltr.
- Argyrolobium pauciflorum Eckl. & Zeyh.
  - subsp. pauciflorum Eckl. & Zeyh.
  - subsp. semiglabrum Harv.
- Argyrolobium petiolare Walp.
- Argyrolobium pseudotuberosum T.J.Edwards
- Argyrolobium pumilum Eckl. & Zeyh.
- Argyrolobium rarum Dummer
- Argyrolobium rotundifolium T.J.Edwards
- Argyrolobium rupestre (E. Mey.) Walp.
  - subsp. aberdaricum (Harms) Polhill
  - subsp. remotum (A. Rich.) Polhill
  - subsp. rupestre (E. Mey.) Walp.
- Argyrolobium sericosemium Harms
- Argyrolobium stipulaceum Eckl. & Zeyh.
- Argyrolobium tomentosum (Andrews) Druce
- Argyrolobium tuberosum Eckl. & Zeyh.
- Argyrolobium velutinum Eckl. & Zeyh.

=== Middle-Eastern and Asian species ===
The following species are found in the Middle East and in south Asia. They have not been assigned to a section.

- Argyrolobium aegacanthoides (Vved.) Moteetee
- Argyrolobium arabicum (Decne.) Jaub. & Spach
- Argyrolobium barikotense Rech.f.
- Argyrolobium biebersteinii P.W. Ball
- Argyrolobium confertum Polhill
- Argyrolobium crotalarioides Jaub. & Spach
- Argyrolobium flaccidum (Royle) Jaub. & Spach
- Argyrolobium pulvinatum Rech. f.
- Argyrolobium roseum (Cambess.) Jaub. & Spach
  - var. album (U.C.Bhattach.) L.B.Chaudhary
  - var. elongatum (Ali) L.B.Chaudhary
  - var. ornithopodioides (Jaub. & Spach) Moteetee
  - var. roseum (Cambess.) Jaub. & Spach
  - var. subuniflorum Boiss.
- Argyrolobium stenophyllum Boiss.

==== Tropical African species ====
The following species are found in tropical Africa. They have not been assigned to a section.

- Argyrolobium aequinoctiale Baker
- Argyrolobium eylesii Baker f.
- Argyrolobium fischeri Taub.
- Argyrolobium friesianum Harms
- Argyrolobium macrophyllum Harms
- Argyrolobium ramosissimum Baker
- Argyrolobium schimperianum A. Rich.
- Argyrolobium stolzii Harms
- Argyrolobium vaginiferum Harms

=== Unassigned ===
The following species have not been assigned to a section.

- Argyrolobium bodkinii Dummer
- Argyrolobium catati (Drake) M. Peltier
- Argyrolobium itremoense Du Puy & Labat
- Argyrolobium microphyllum Ball
- Argyrolobium pedunculare Benth.
- Argyrolobium saharae Pomel
- Argyrolobium terme Walp.
- Argyrolobium thomii Harv.
- Argyrolobium zanonii (Turra) P.W. Ball
- Argyrolobium uniflorum (Decne.) Jaub. & Spach

== Species names with uncertain taxonomic status ==
The status of the following species is unresolved:

- Argyrolobium adscendens (E. Mey.) Walp. ex Harms
- Argyrolobium armindae Marrero Rodr.
- Argyrolobium dasycarpum Hochst. ex Baker
- Argyrolobium dimidiatum Schinz
- Argyrolobium fallax Ball
- Argyrolobium filicaule Hochst. ex Engl.
- Argyrolobium fulvicaule Hochst. ex Engl.
- Argyrolobium krebsianum C.Presl
- Argyrolobium monticola Baker f.
- Argyrolobium mucilagineum Blatt.
- Argyrolobium purpurascens Blatt.
- Argyrolobium remotum Hochst. ex A.Rich.
- Argyrolobium robustum T.J.Edwards
- Argyrolobium sessilifolium Janka
- Argyrolobium strigosum Blatt.

== Phylogeny ==
The following relationships have been suggested for the South African species of the genus Argyrolobium:

- - Argyrolobium
    - - - Section Argyrolobium
          - Argyrolobium tomentosum
          - - - - - - Argyrolobium humile
                    - Argyrolobium adscendens
                    - Argyrolobium rupestre
                    - Argyrolobium rotundifolium
                    - Argyrolobium campicola
                  - - Argyrolobium sericosemum
                    - Argyrolobium marginatum
                - Argyrolobium molle
              - - Argyrolobium pumilum
                - - Argyrolobium pauciflorum
                  - Argyrolobium lotoides
            - - - - Argyrolobium candicans
                  - Argyrolobium stipulaceum
                - Argyrolobium velutinum
              - - - - - Argyrolobium pachyphyllum
                      - Argyrolobium barbatum
                    - Argyrolobium petiolare
                  - Argyrolobium argenteum
                - - Argyrolobium collinum
                  - - Argyrolobium filiforme
                    - - Argyrolobium rarum
                      - - Argyrolobium aciculare
                        - - Argyrolobium harveyanum
                          - - Argyrolobium pseudotuberosum
                            - - Argyrolobium angustissimum
                              - Argyrolobium tuberosum
        - Section Transvaalense
          - Argyrolobium transvaalense
          - - Argyrolobium muddii
            - - Argyrolobium frutescens
              - Argyrolobium wilmsii
          - - Argyrolobium megarrhizum
            - - Argyrolobium longifolium
              - - Argyrolobium speciosum
                - Argyrolobium baptisioides
        - Section Polyphyllum
          - - Argyrolobium trifoliatum
            - Argyrolobium polphyllum
          - - Argyrolobium crassifolium
            - - Argyrolobium incanum
              - Argyrolobium parviflorum
      - Section Lunare
        - Argyrolobium lunare
        - Argyrolobium splendens
    - Section Amplexicaule
      - Argyrolobium amplexicaule
      - Argyrolobium crinitum
  - Polhillia (outgroup)
