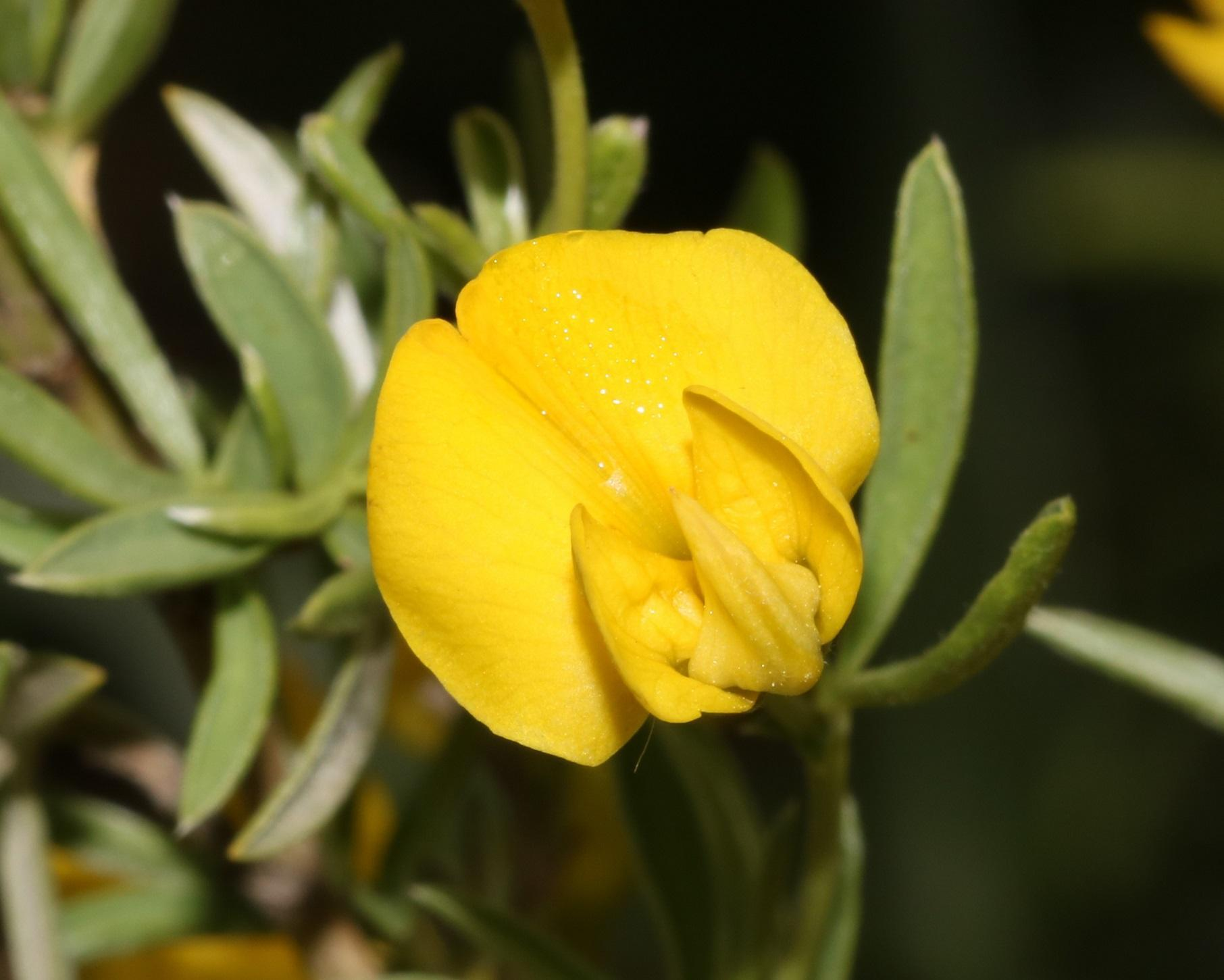

Conservation status
- Critically endangered (SANBI Red List)

Scientific classification
- Kingdom: Plantae
- Clade: Tracheophytes
- Clade: Angiosperms
- Clade: Eudicots
- Clade: Rosids
- Order: Fabales
- Family: Fabaceae
- Subfamily: Faboideae
- Genus: Polhillia
- Species: P. ignota

Binomial name
- Polhillia ignota Boatwr.

= Polhillia ignota =

Species of plant endemic to South Africa

Polhillia ignota is a species of flowering plant in the genus Polhillia. Prior to its rediscovery in September 2016, it was known from two specimens, and declared extinct in 2014. There are only 13 plants known, on a small renosterveld fragment less than 3 ha (7.4 acres) in size. It is endemic to Eendekuil, in the Western Cape.

== Distribution ==
Polhillia ignota is found from northern Swartland, between Vredenburg, Eendekuil and Porterville.

== Description ==
Polhillia ignota is a large, rounded shrub, up to 1 m (3 ft 3 in) in height. Its inflorescences are yellow.

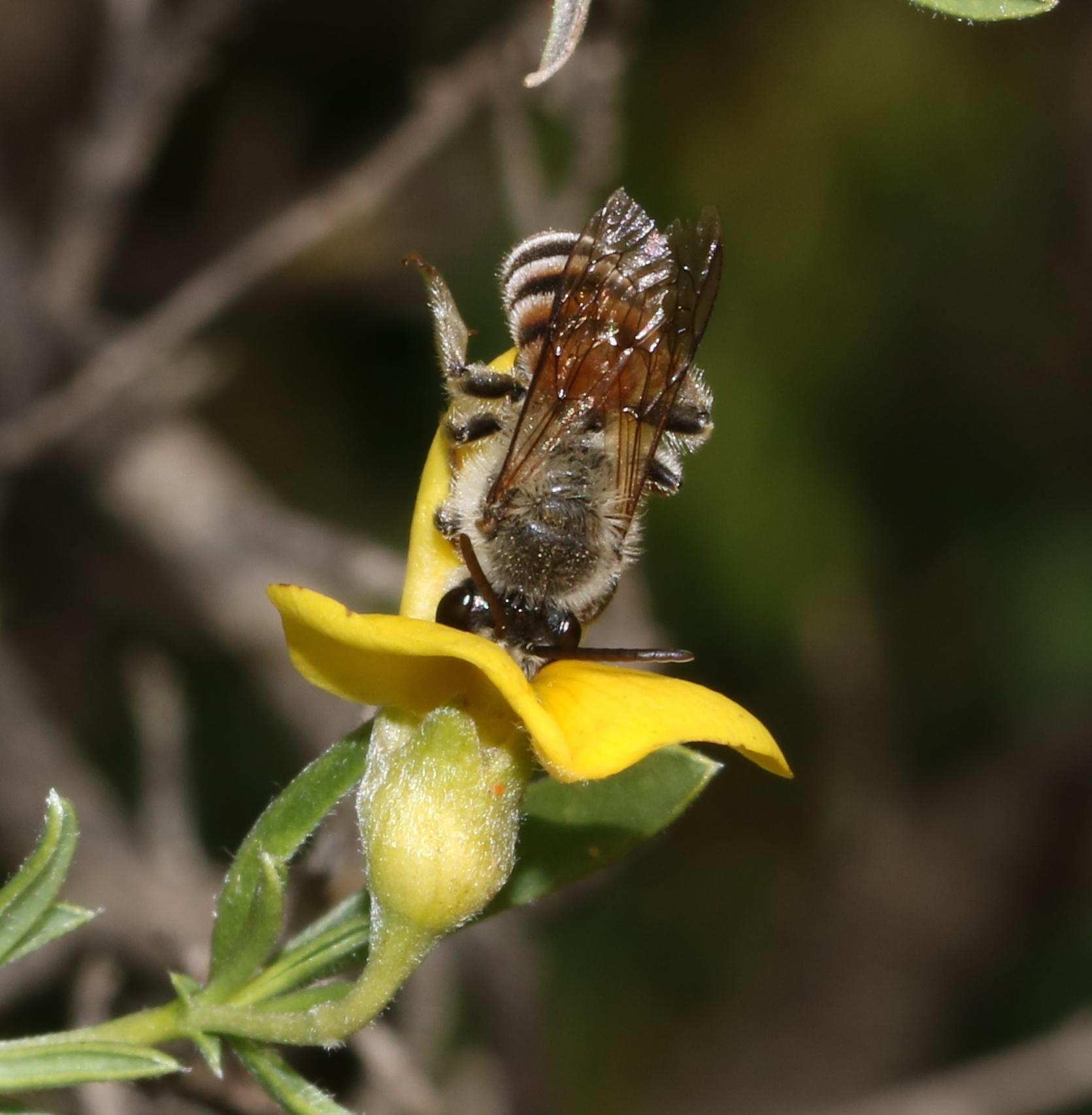

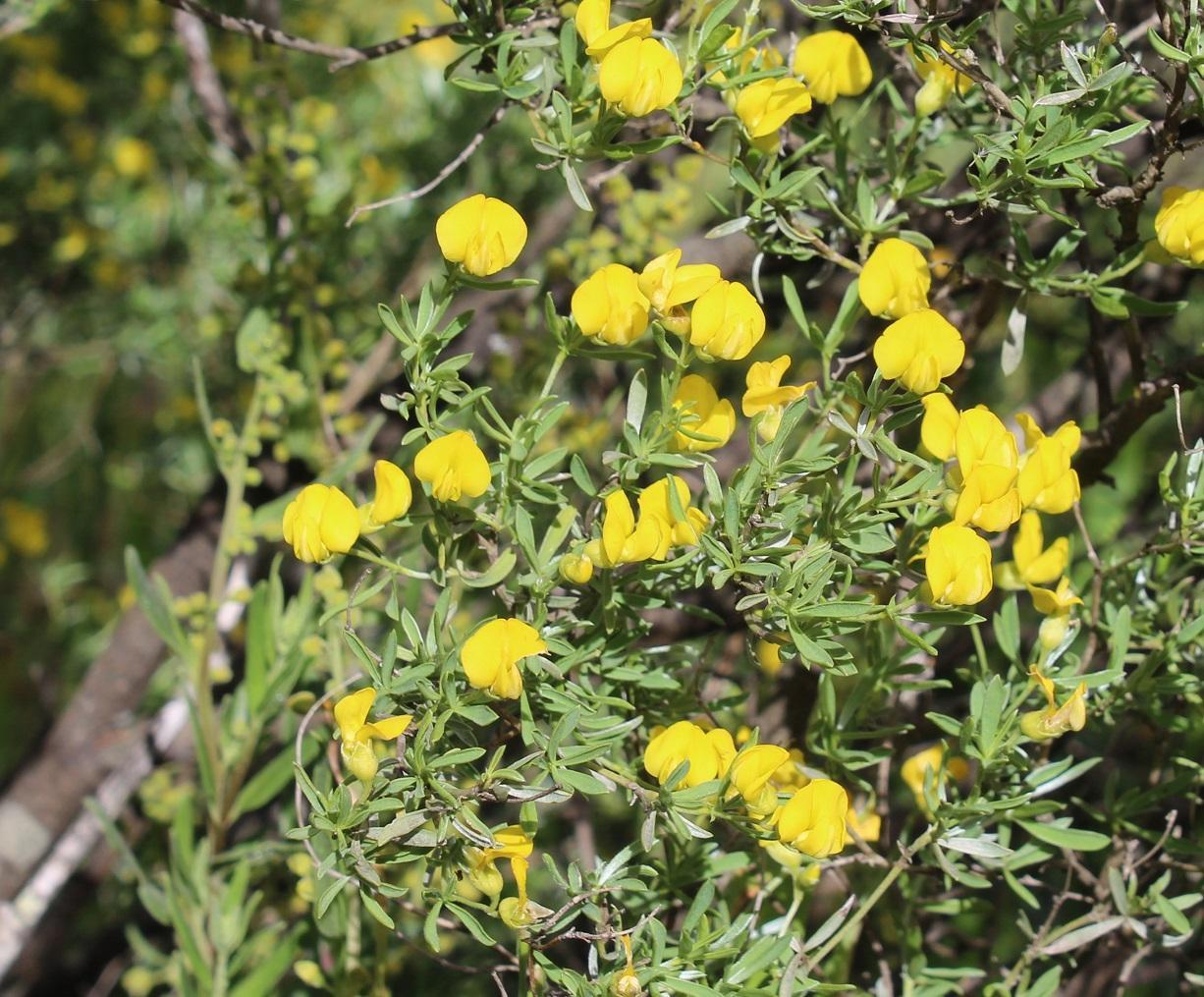

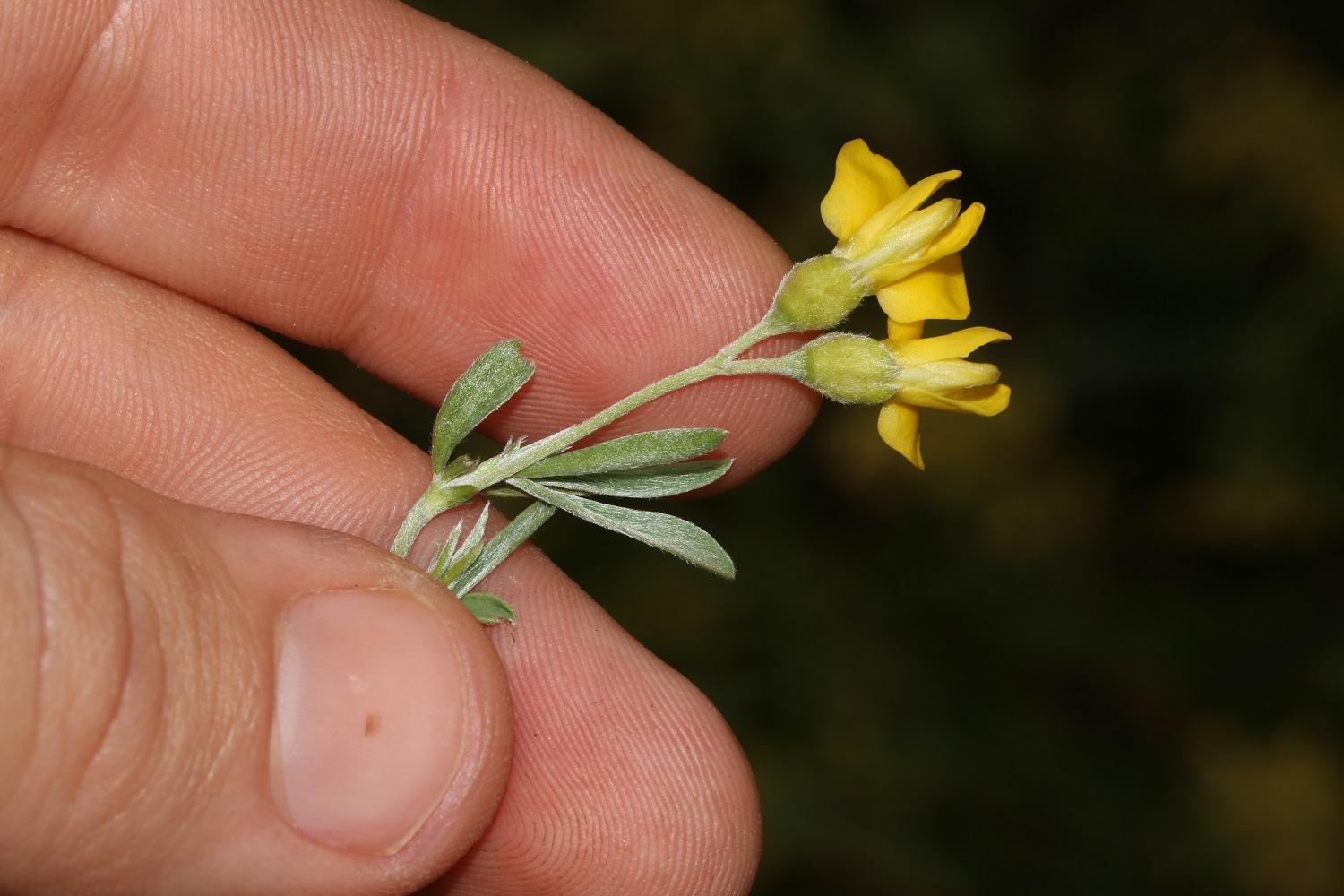

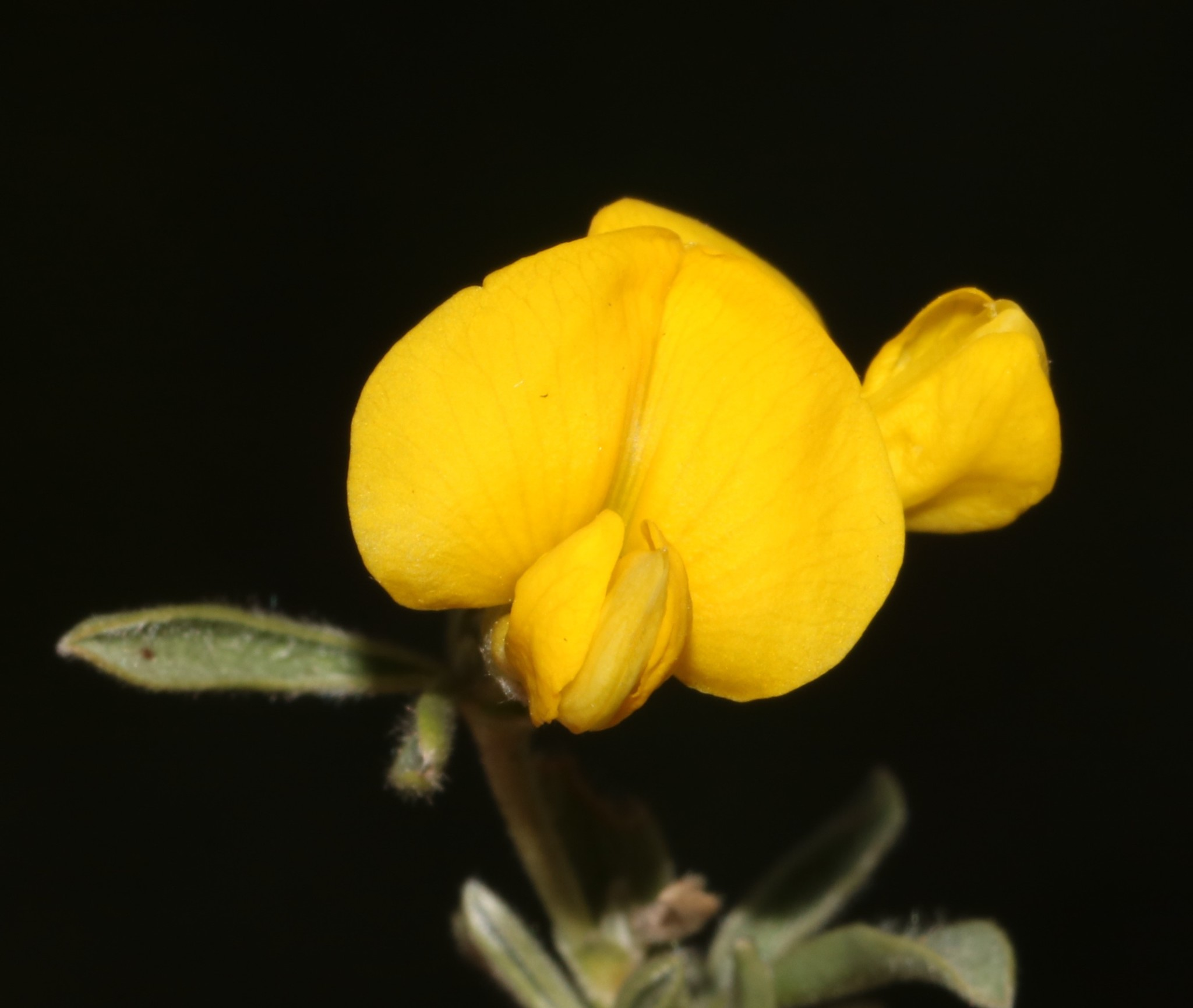

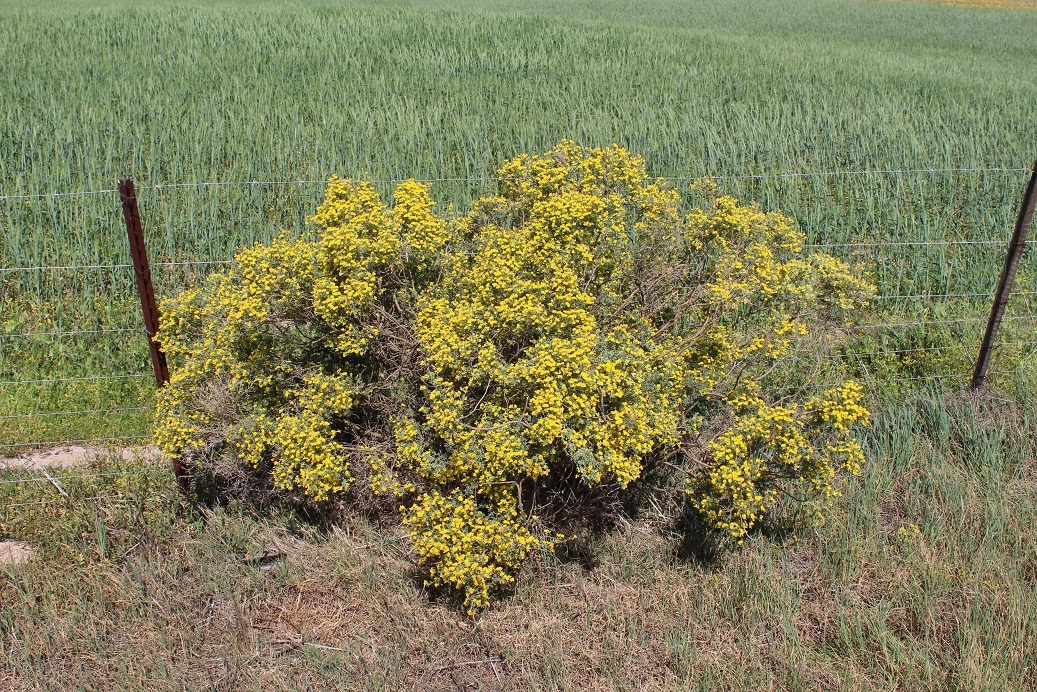

== Conservation status ==
Polhillia ignota is classified as Critically Endangered as it occurs in critically endangered Swartland Shale Renosterveld, of which only 10% remain. A single, small subpopulation of 13 plants remain in a renosterveld fragment near Eendekuil, with an EOO 4 km^{2} (1.5 sq mi), and an AOO of less than 4 km^{2} (1.5 sq mi). The population is expected to continue to decline due to ongoing threats of habitat degradation and competition from alien invasive plants.
