= Elisabetta Caminèr Turra =

- Engraved portrait of Elisabetta Caminèr Turra
- Born: 29 July 1751; Venice, Republic of Venice
- Died: 7 June 1796 (aged 44); Orgiano, Republic of Venice
- Resting place: Santo Stefano, Vicenza
- Occupations: Writer; Journalist; Translator
- Writing career
- Language: Italian
- Genres: Journalism; translation
- Movement: Italian Enlightenment

Elisabetta Caminèr Turra (29 July 1751 – 7 June 1796), was a Venetian writer and journalist. She was one of the earliest prominent female journalists and editors in Italy.

== Biography ==
Elisabetta Caminèr Turra was born in Venice on 29 July 1751. Her father, Domenico Caminèr, was a prominent Venetian intellectual and journalist. Elisabetta followed in her father’s footsteps. At the age of eighteen, she translated Fenouillot de Falbaire's play L'Honnête criminel, ou L'Amour filial into Italian. Elisabetta's translation was favourably received by critics and performed in major Italian theatres. In 1769, she married Antonio Turra, a noted physician and botanist from Vicenza.

Elisabetta had been contributing to her father's literary journal, L'Europa Letteraria, since her early youth. In May 1773, L'Europa Letteraria ceased publication. In its final issue, the magazine announced a new, more extensive publishing venture that would inherit its intellectual spirit: the Giornale Enciclopedico, edited by Elisabetta and her father. The Giornale continued the work of its predecessor, making only slight changes to its structure to broaden its cultural horizons and expand its circle of contributors.

Several prominent Italian authors contributed to the journal, including Alberto Fortis, Antonio Maria Lorgna, Lazzaro Spallanzani and Vincenzo Monti and Giuseppe Toaldo. In January 1777, the journal's headquarters moved to Vicenza, and Elisabetta became director. She was joined by Giovanni Scola, one of the sharpest and most radical minds of the Venetian Enlightenment. In 1779, prompted by censorship issues faced with other publishers, the couple opened their own printing shop on Contrà Canove and published the Piccola enciclopedia (Small Encyclopedia), featuring fables, short dramatic sketches, moral tales for young people, and other short texts for women.

In the 1780s, Elisabetta achieved notable success as a translator. Her translations of Salomon Gessner's Works (Vicenza, 1781) and Jean-François Marmontel's New Collection of Moral Tales (Vicenza, 1783) are particularly notable. From 1794, she directed a drama school for young amateurs at the San Servolo theatre. In 1795, she was diagnosed with breast cancer and underwent unsuccessful surgery. She died on 7 June 1796 at the villa of her friend Giovanni Battista Fracanzan in Orgiano, and was buried in the church of Santo Stefano in Vicenza.

== Works ==
- Catherine M. Sama, ed. (2003). Elisabetta Caminèr Turra: Selected Writings of an Eighteenth-Century Venetian Woman of Letters. Chicago: University of Chicago Press. ISBN 978-0226817682.

== Bibliography ==
- De Michelis, Cesare (1974). "CAMINER, Elisabetta". Dizionario Biografico degli Italiani (in Italian). Vol. 17: Calvart–Canefri. Rome: Istituto dell'Enciclopedia Italiana. ISBN 978-88-12-00032-6.
