= Somme-Bionne =

- Commune
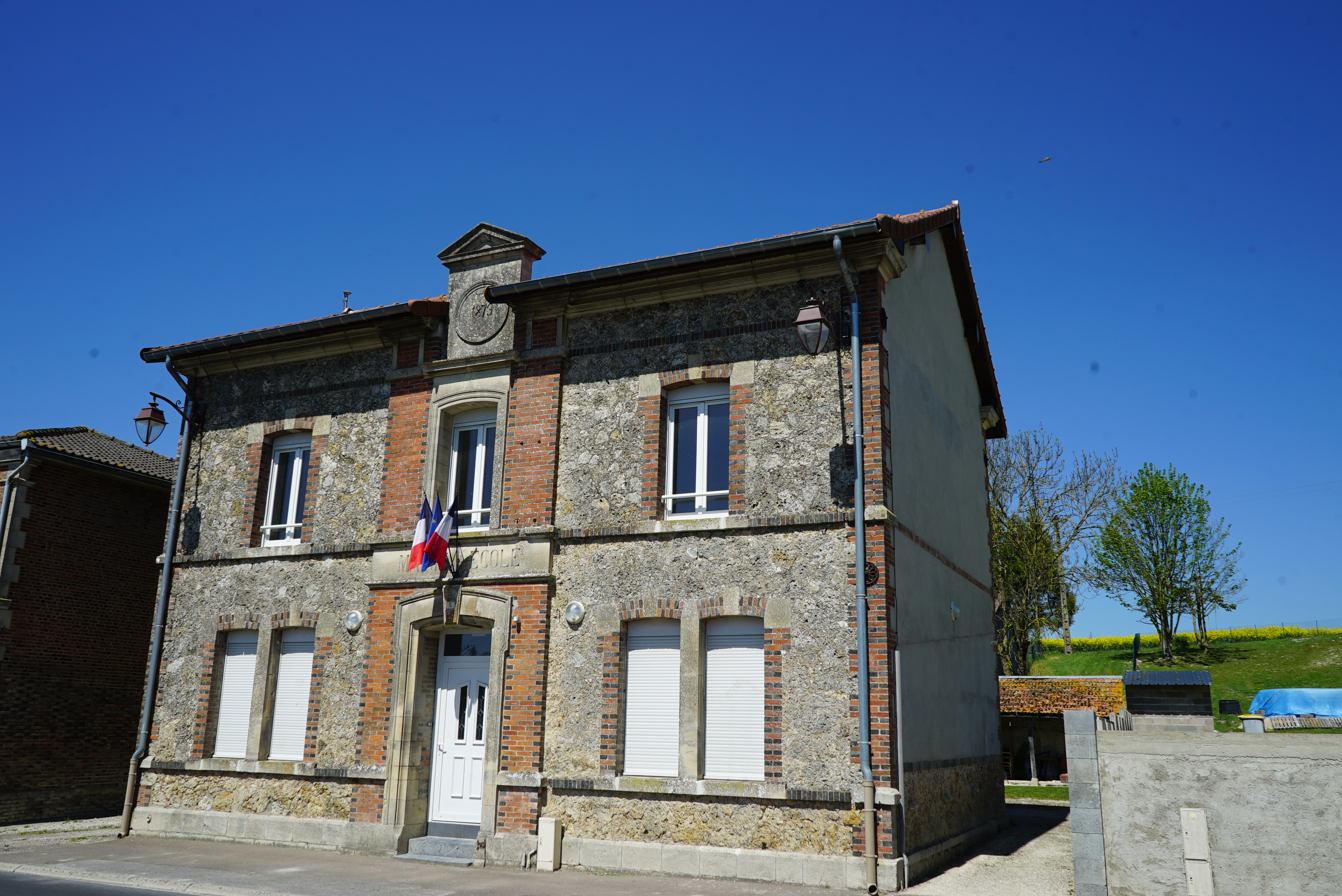
- The town hall in Somme-Bionne
- Location of Somme-Bionne
- Location within France Location within Grand Est
- Coordinates: 49°05′42″N 4°43′32″E
- Country: France
- Region: Grand Est
- Department: Marne
- Arrondissement: Châlons-en-Champagne
- Canton: Argonne Suippe et Vesle
- Intercommunality: Argonne Champenoise

Government
  - Mayor (2020–2026): Fabrice Bruaux
- Area^{1}: 9.21 km^{2} (3.56 sq mi)
- Elevation: 168 m (551 ft)
- Highest elevation: 197 m (646 ft)
- Lowest elevation: 144 m (472 ft)
- Population (2023): 70
  - Density: 7.6/km^{2} (20/sq mi)
- Time zone: UTC+01:00 (CET)
  - Summer (DST): UTC+02:00 (CEST)
- INSEE/Postal code: 51543 /51800
- ^{1} French Land Register data, which excludes lakes, ponds, glaciers > 1 km^{2} (0.386 sq mi or 247 acres) and river estuaries.

Somme-Bionne (French pronunciation: [sɔm bjɔn]) is a commune in the Marne department in north-eastern France. An important Iron Age chariot burial of 450-300 BC was found in the vicinity of the village in the nineteenth century. The finds from the La Tène period grave came into the possession of the French collector Léon Morel, who sold it, along with his entire antiquities collection from the Champagne region of France, to the British Museum in 1901.

== Finds from the Celtic Somme-Bionne chariot burial ==
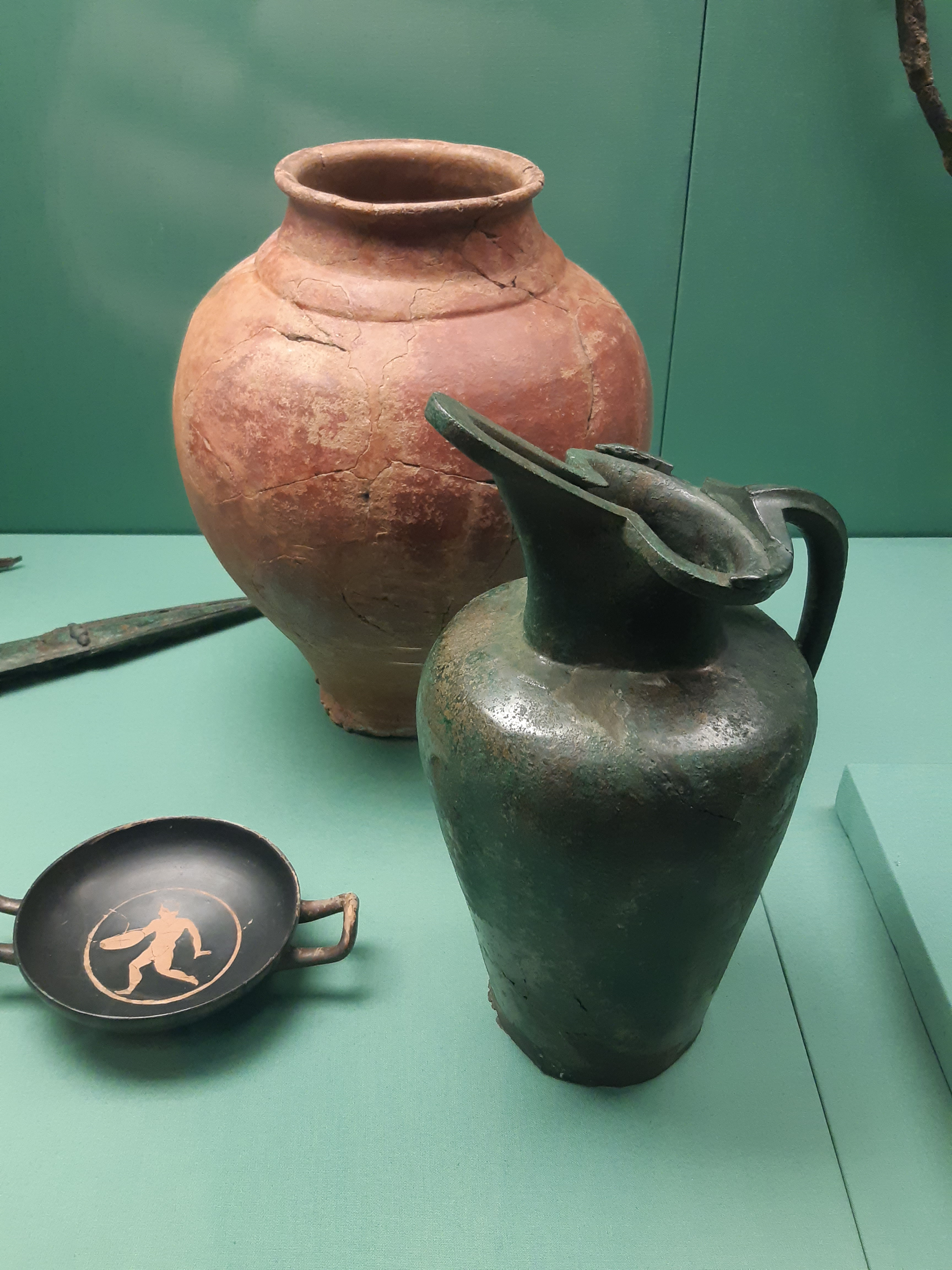

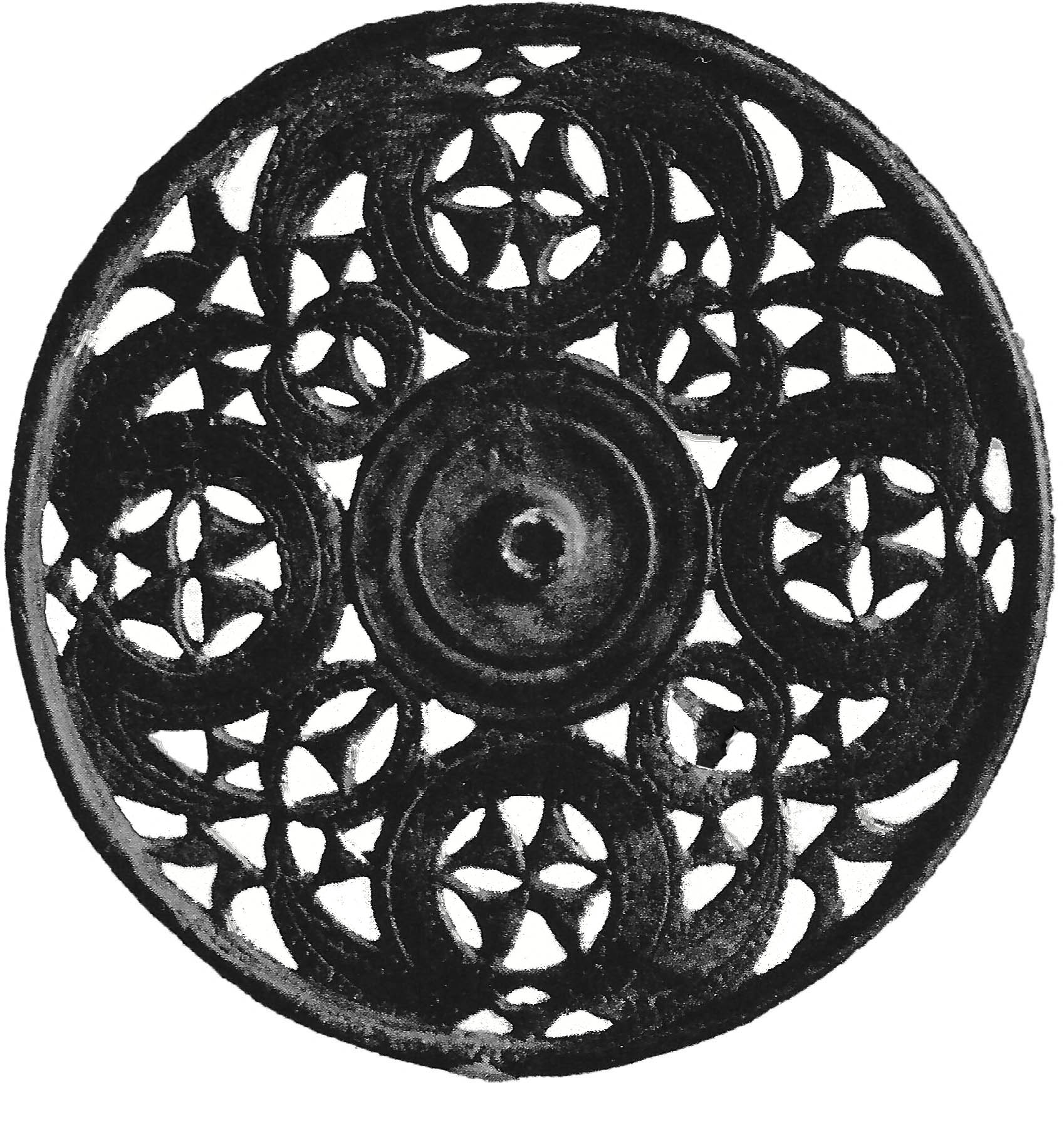

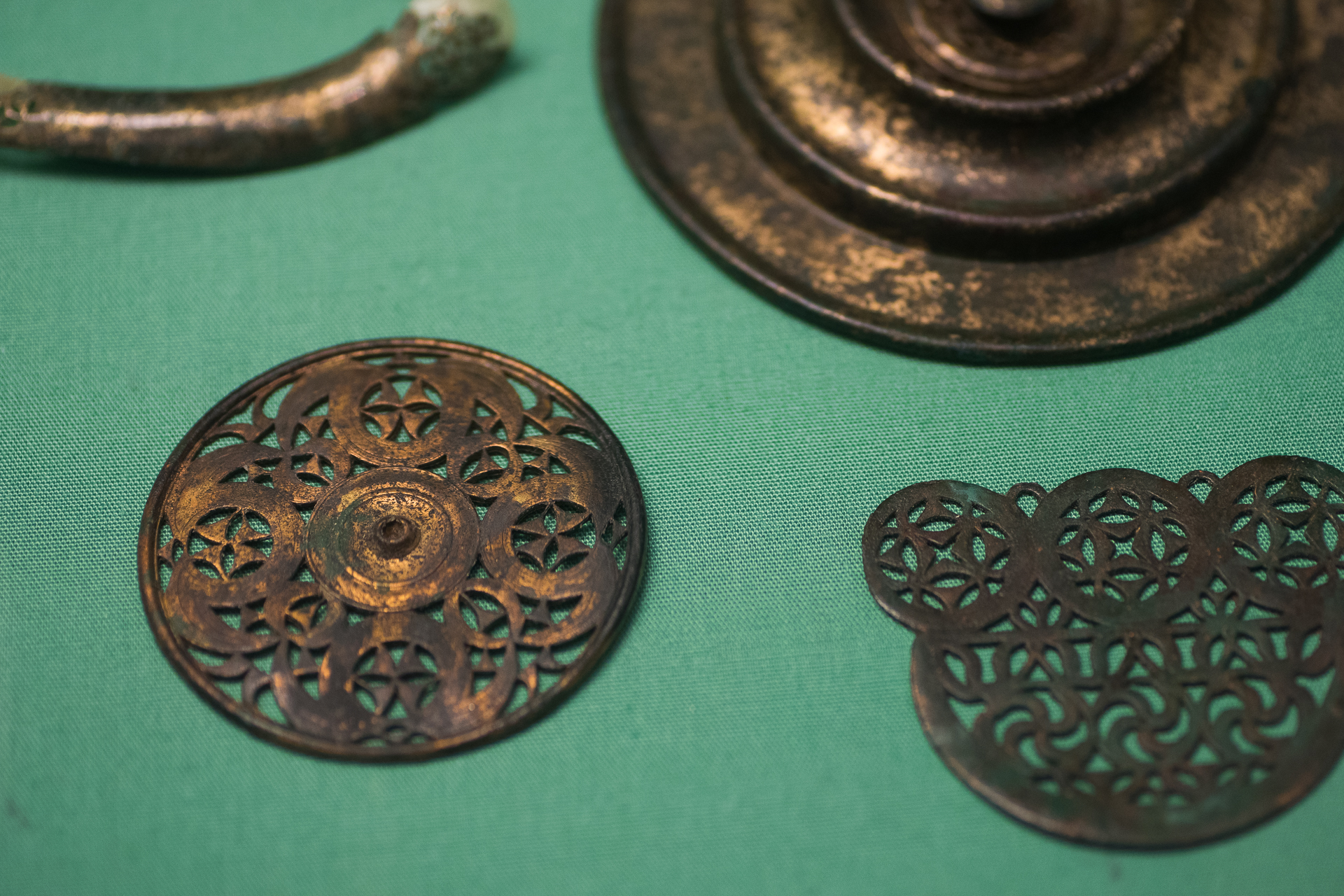

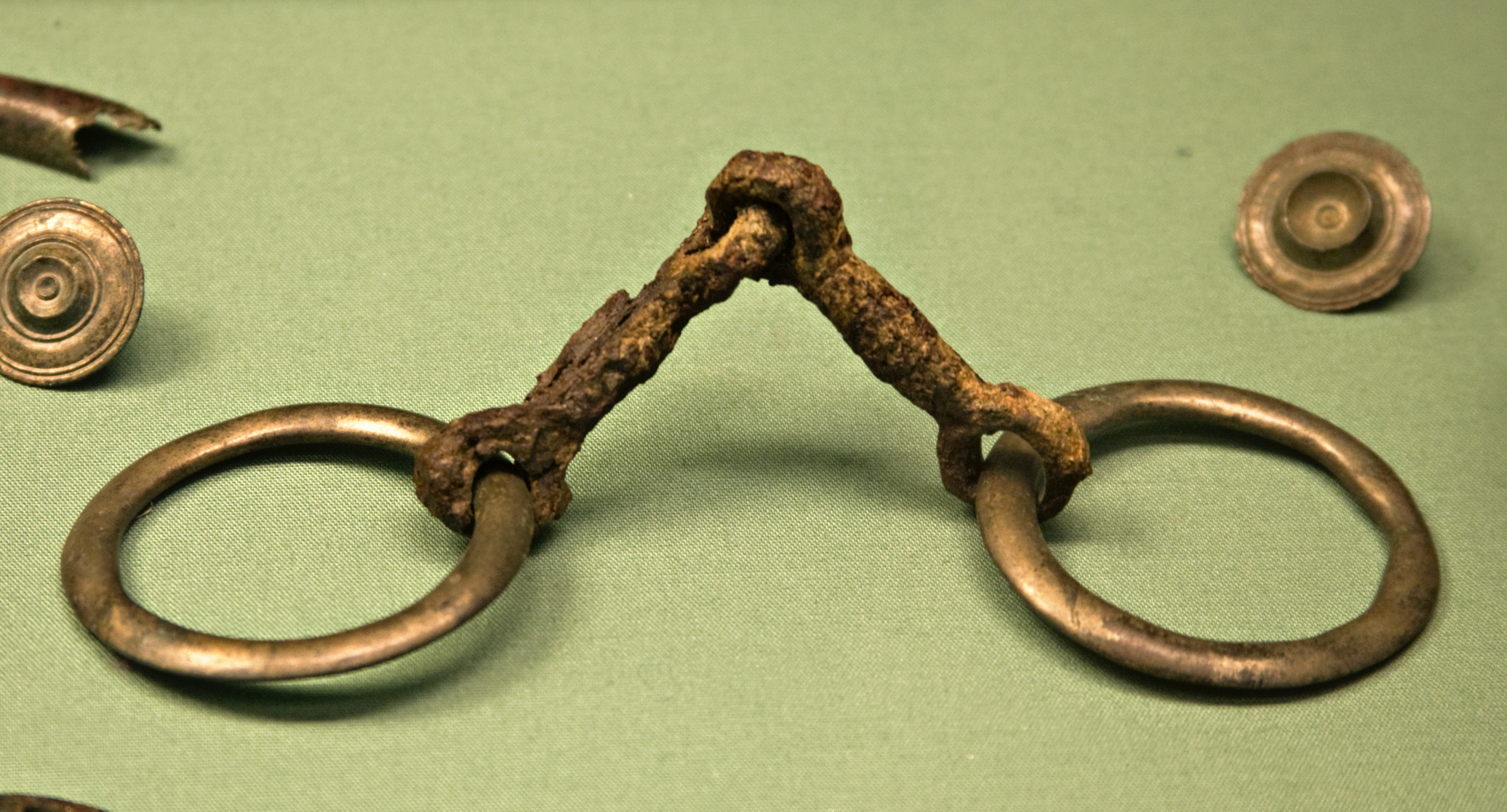

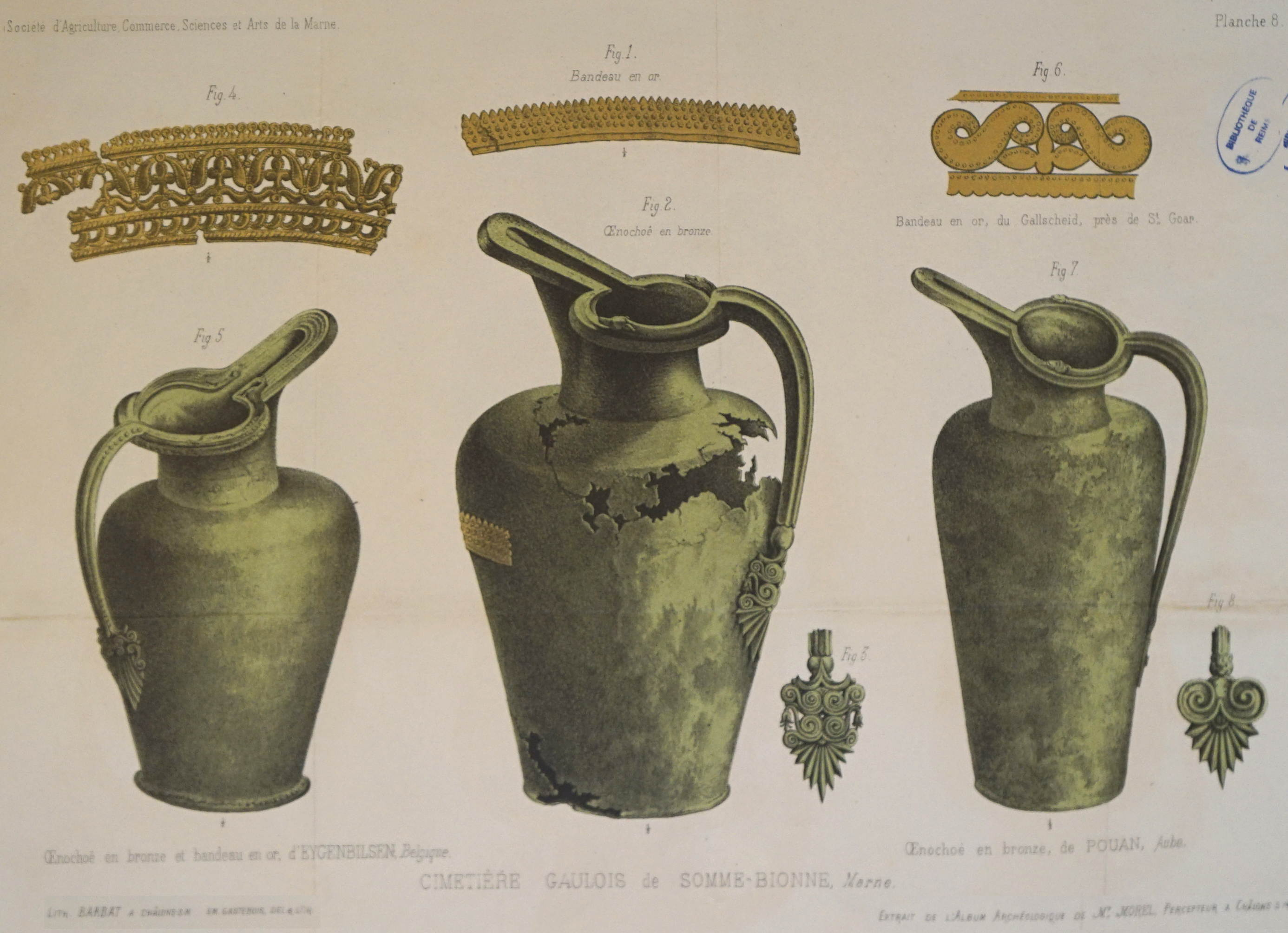

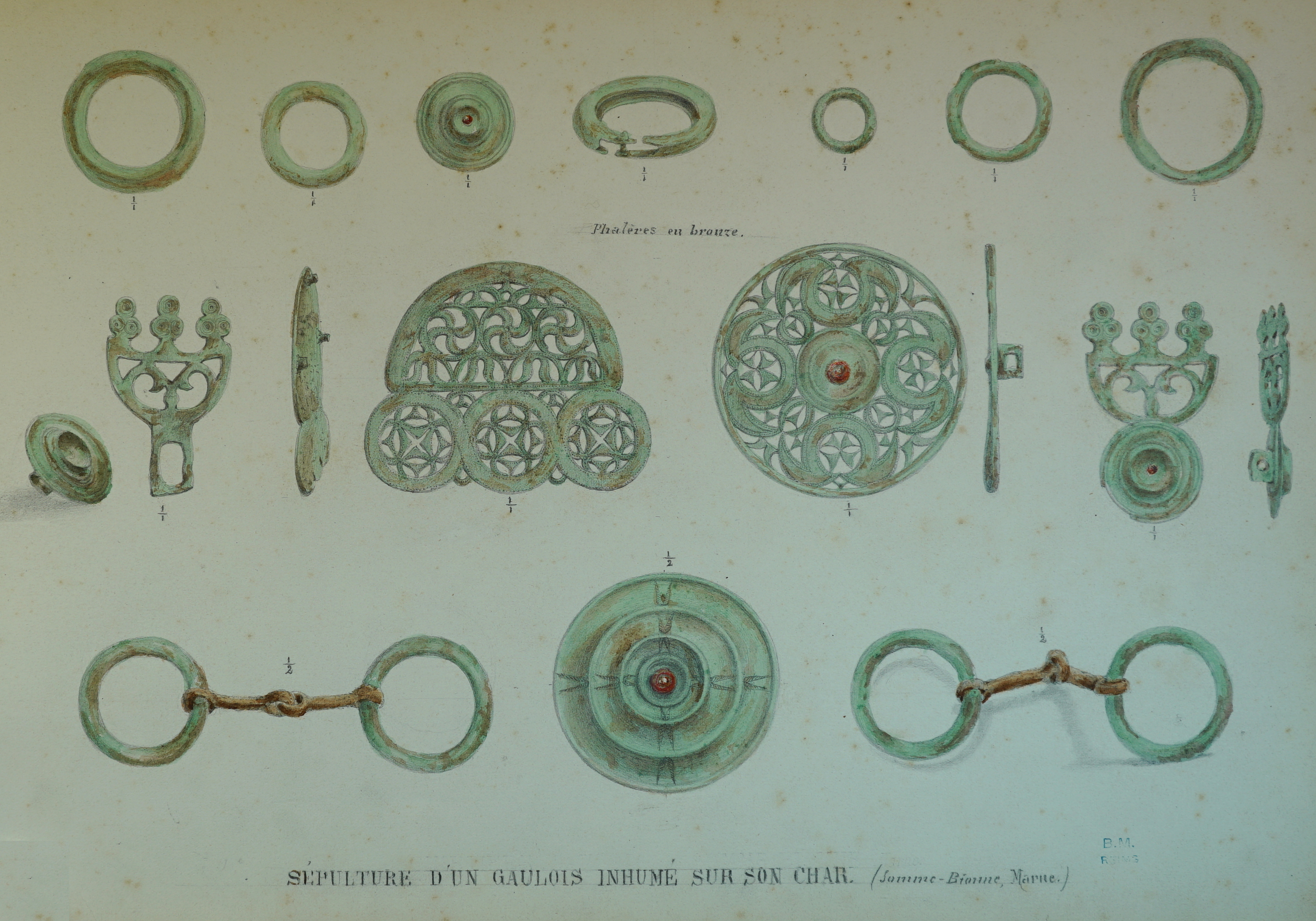

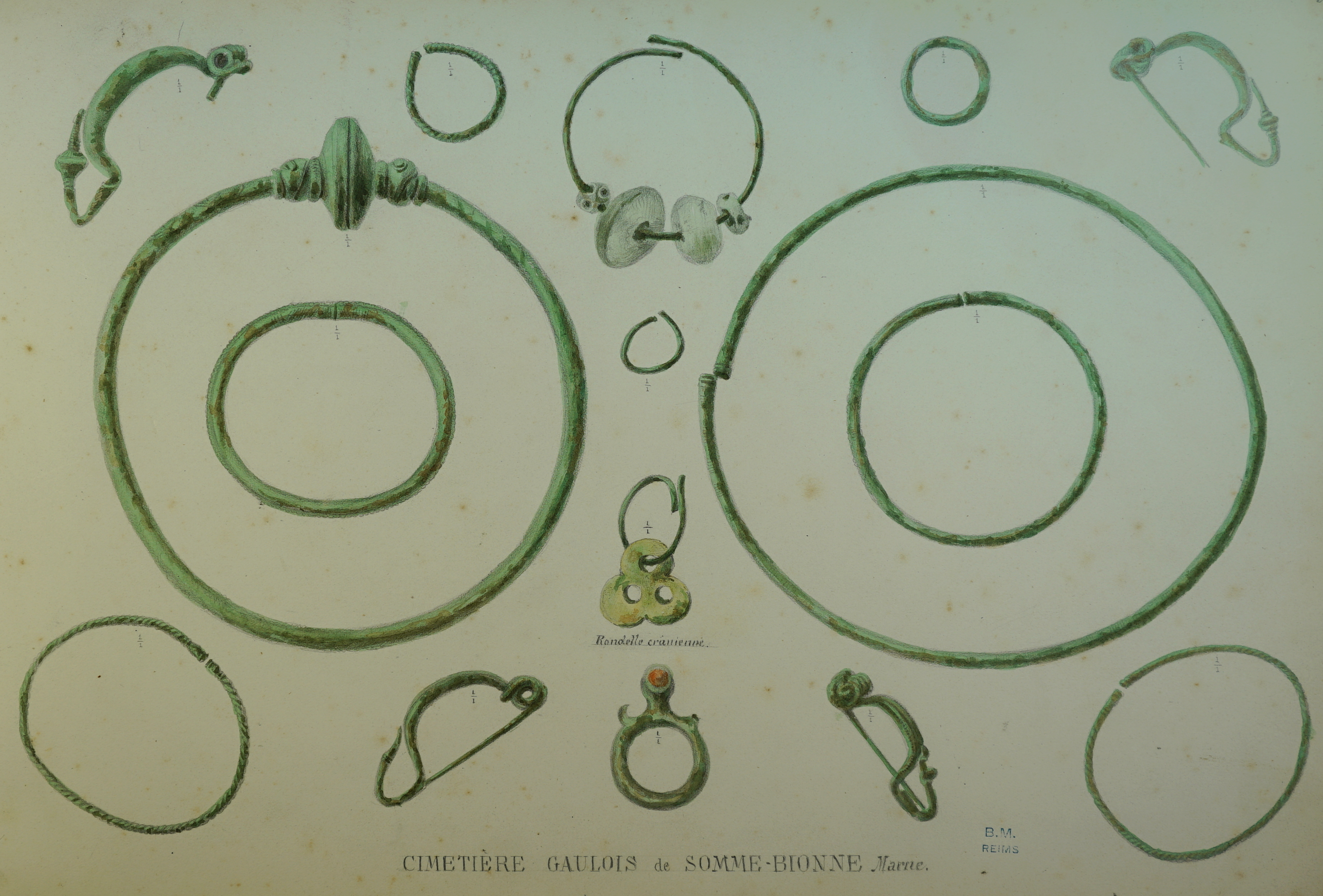

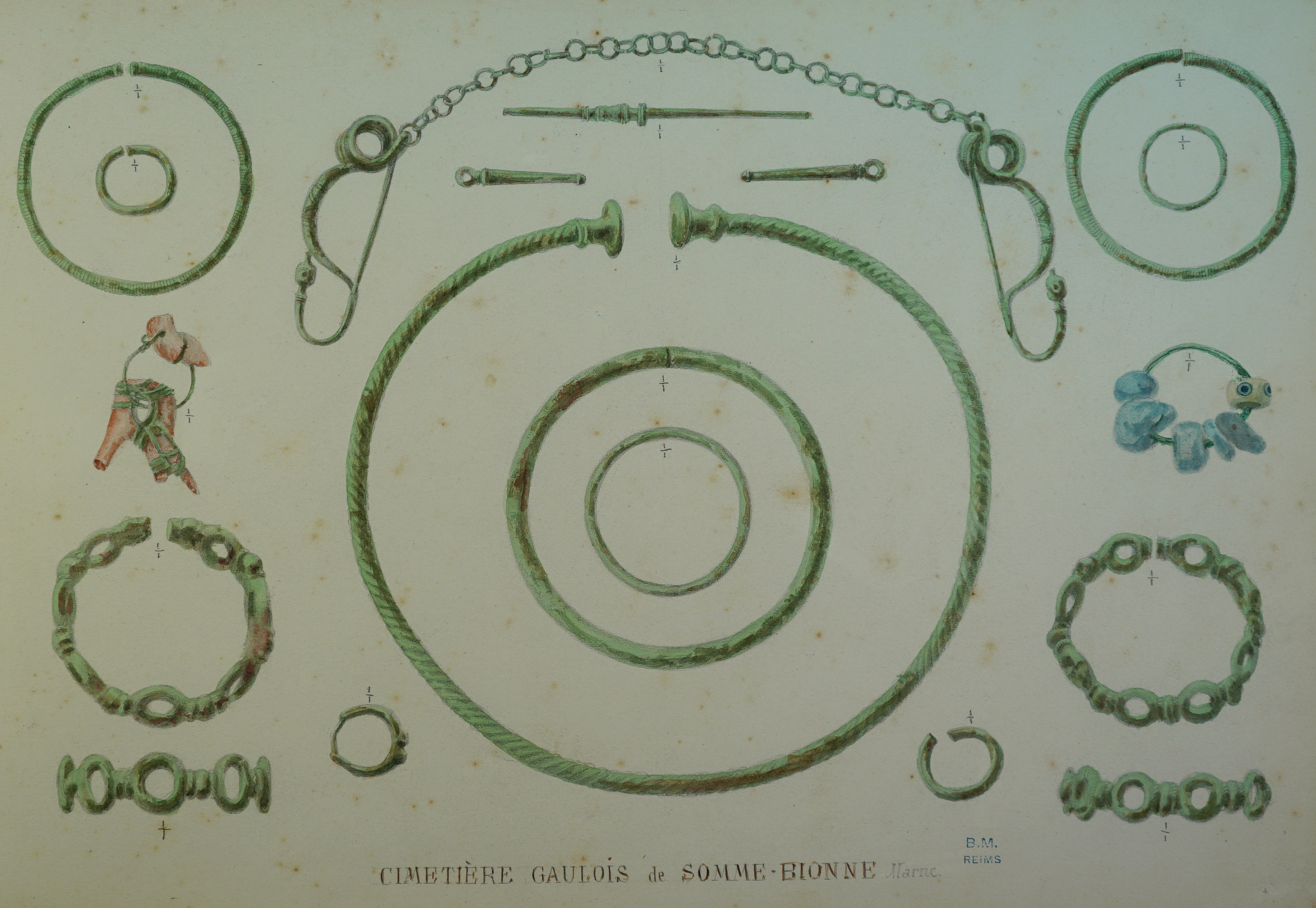

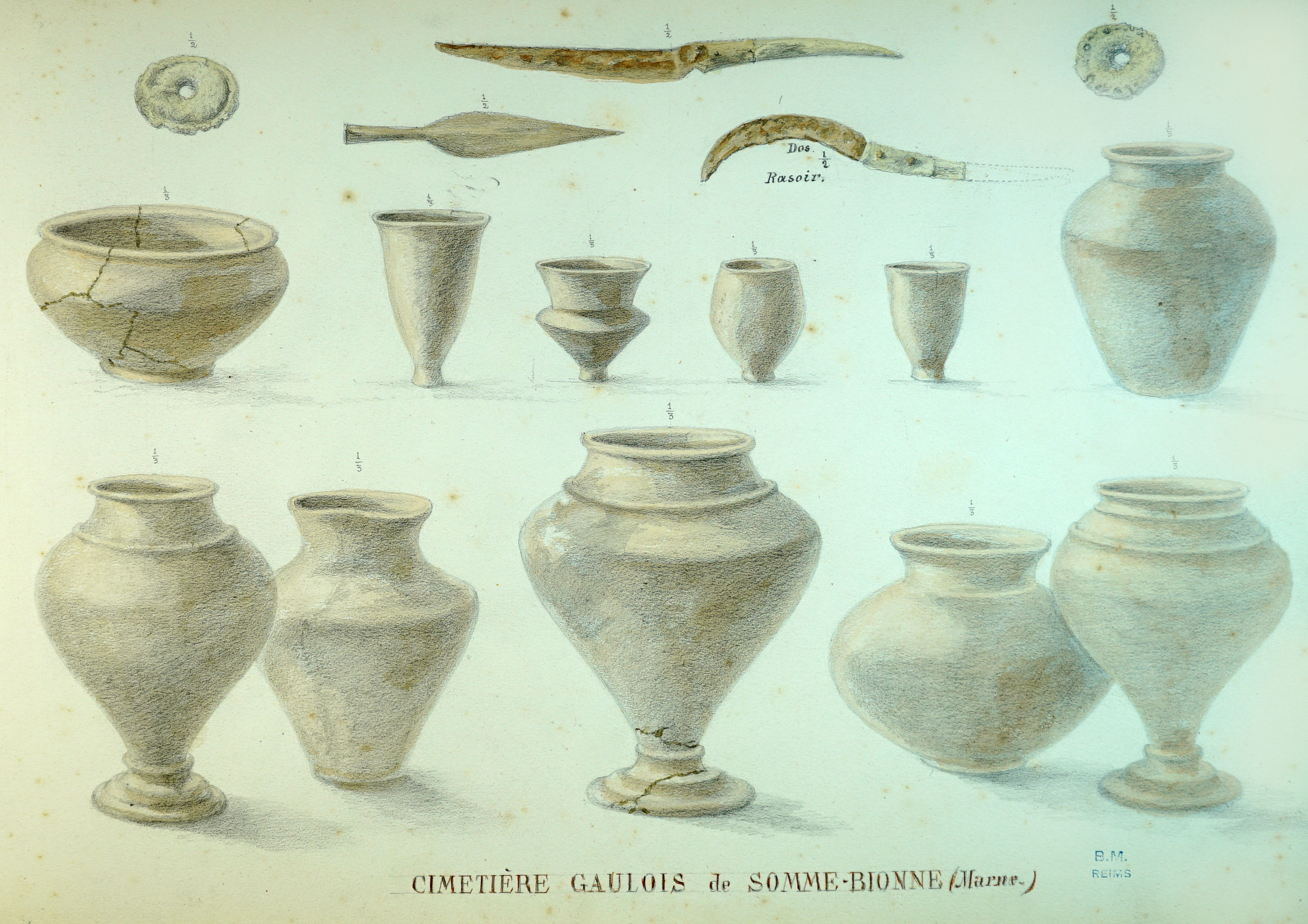

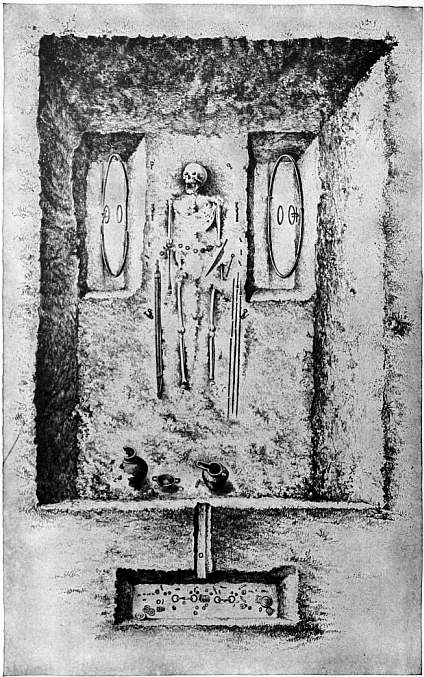

== See also ==
- Communes of the Marne department

== See also ==
- Iron Age France
- La Tène culture
