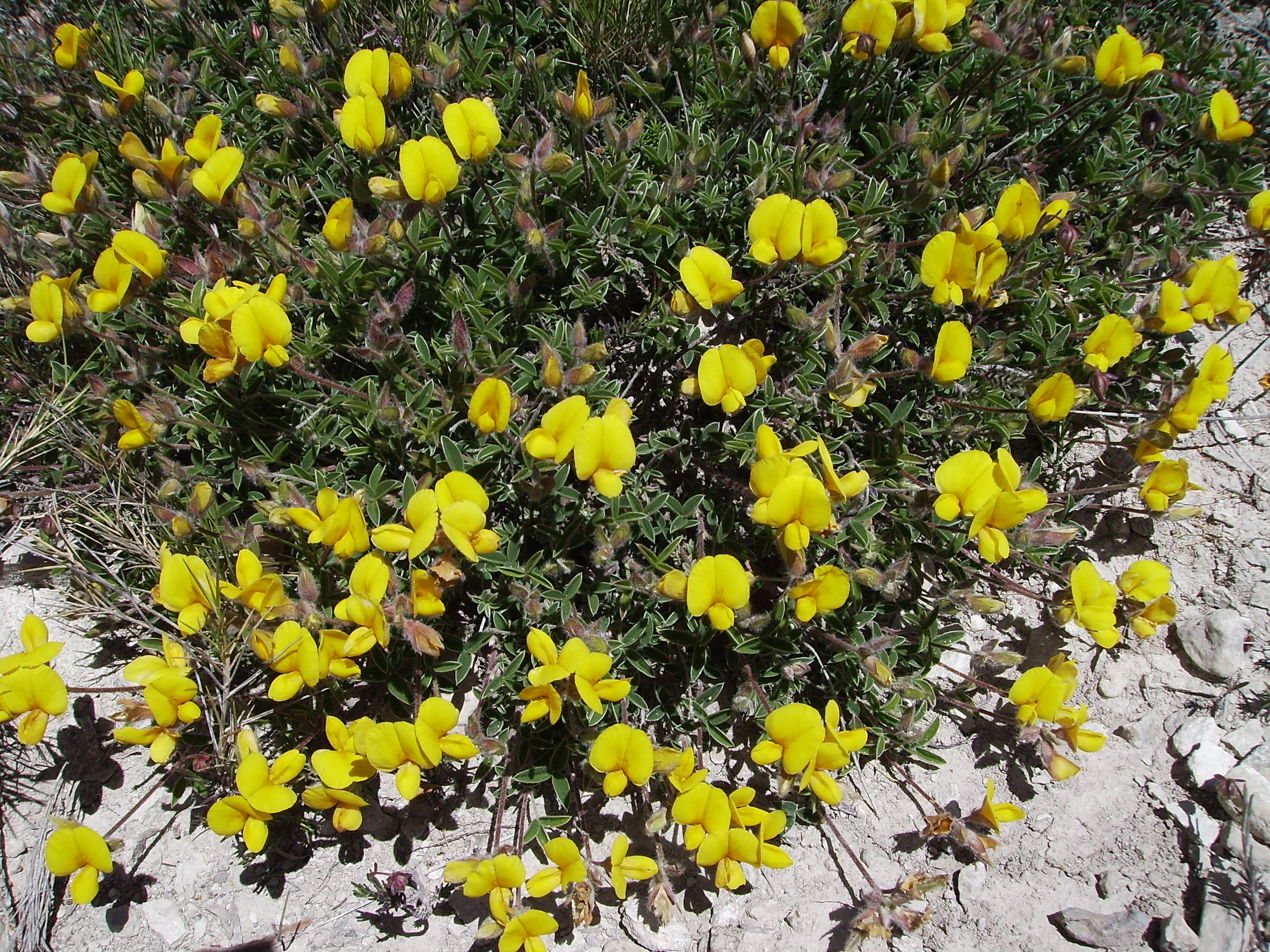

Scientific classification
- Kingdom: Plantae
- Clade: Tracheophytes
- Clade: Angiosperms
- Clade: Eudicots
- Clade: Rosids
- Order: Fabales
- Family: Fabaceae
- Subfamily: Faboideae
- Genus: Argyrolobium
- Species: A. zanonii

Binomial name
- Argyrolobium zanonii (Turra) P.W.Ball

Synonyms
- Cytisus zanonii Turra

= Argyrolobium zanonii =

Species of flowering plant

Argyrolobium zanonii is a species of shrubby flowering plant in the family Fabaceae. It is native to Europe and Africa, occurring in countries situated in the Western and Central Mediterranean, including, but not limited to, Greece, countries of Northwest Balkans, France, Spain, Morocco, Algeria and Tunisia. Additionally, it has been introduced into Germany.

== Taxonomy ==
The species was first described by Italian botanist Antonio Turra in 1780 as Cytisus zanonii, but has since been transferred to the genus Argyrolobium by Peter William Ball in 1968 under its current binomial name.

== Gallery ==
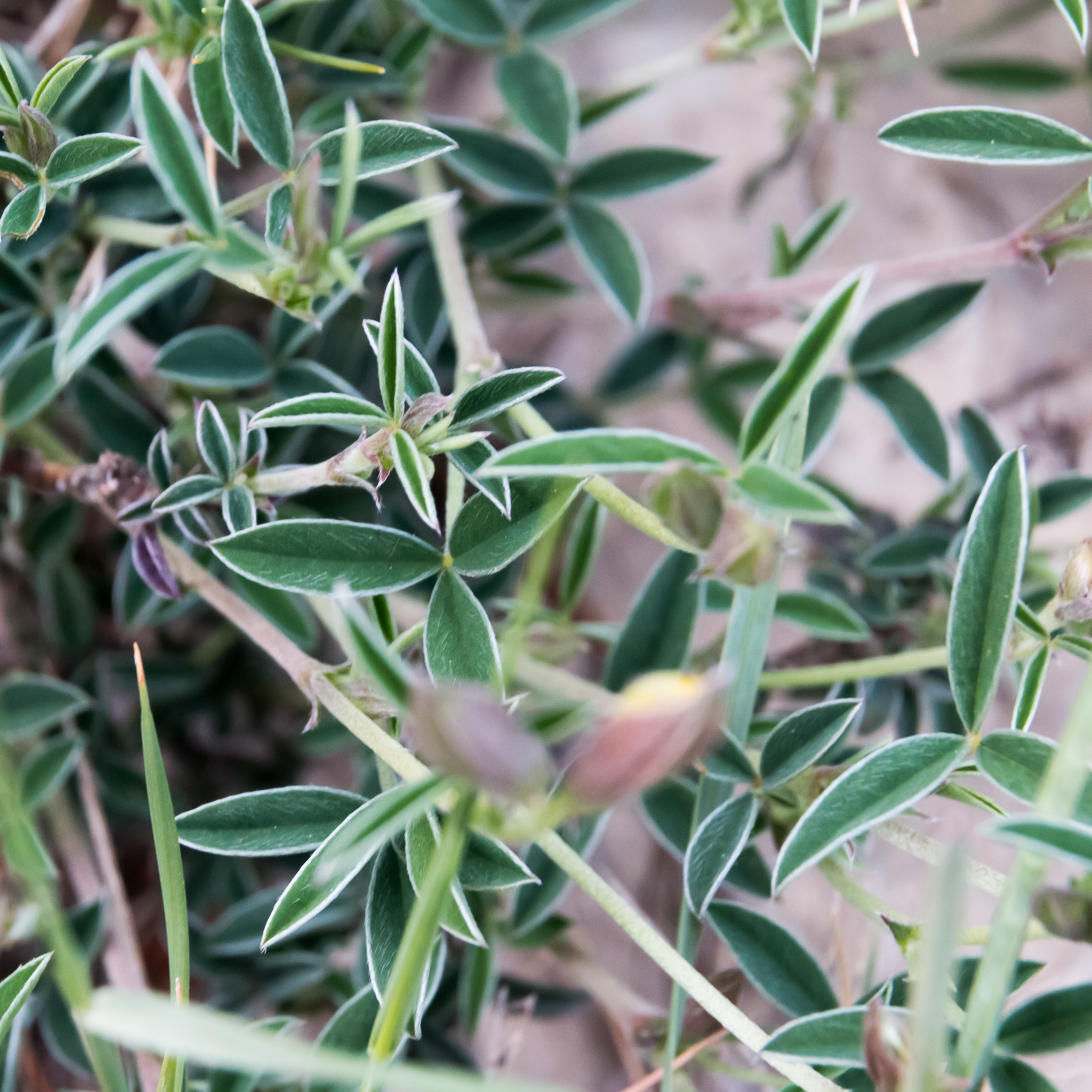
Trifoliate leaves

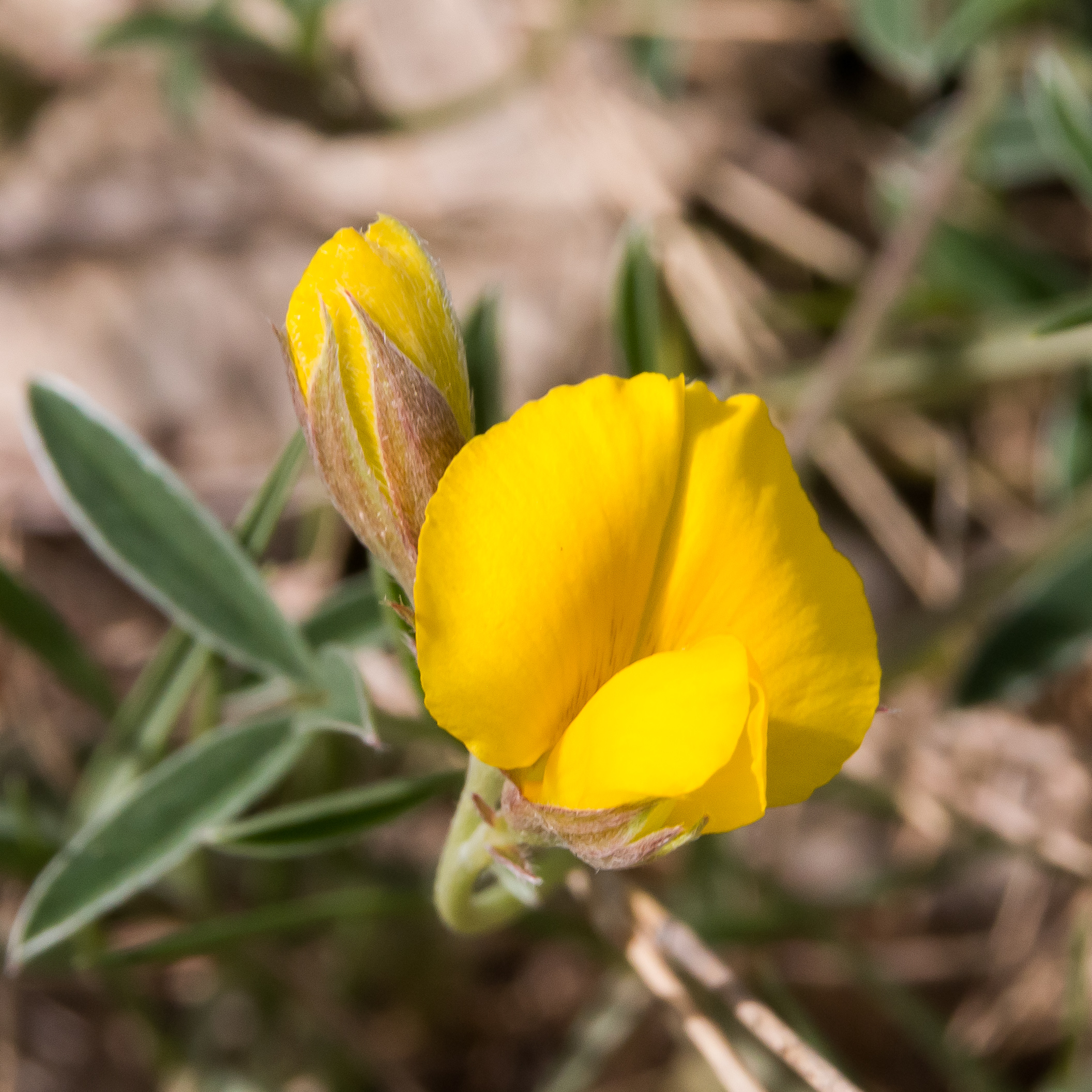
Flowers

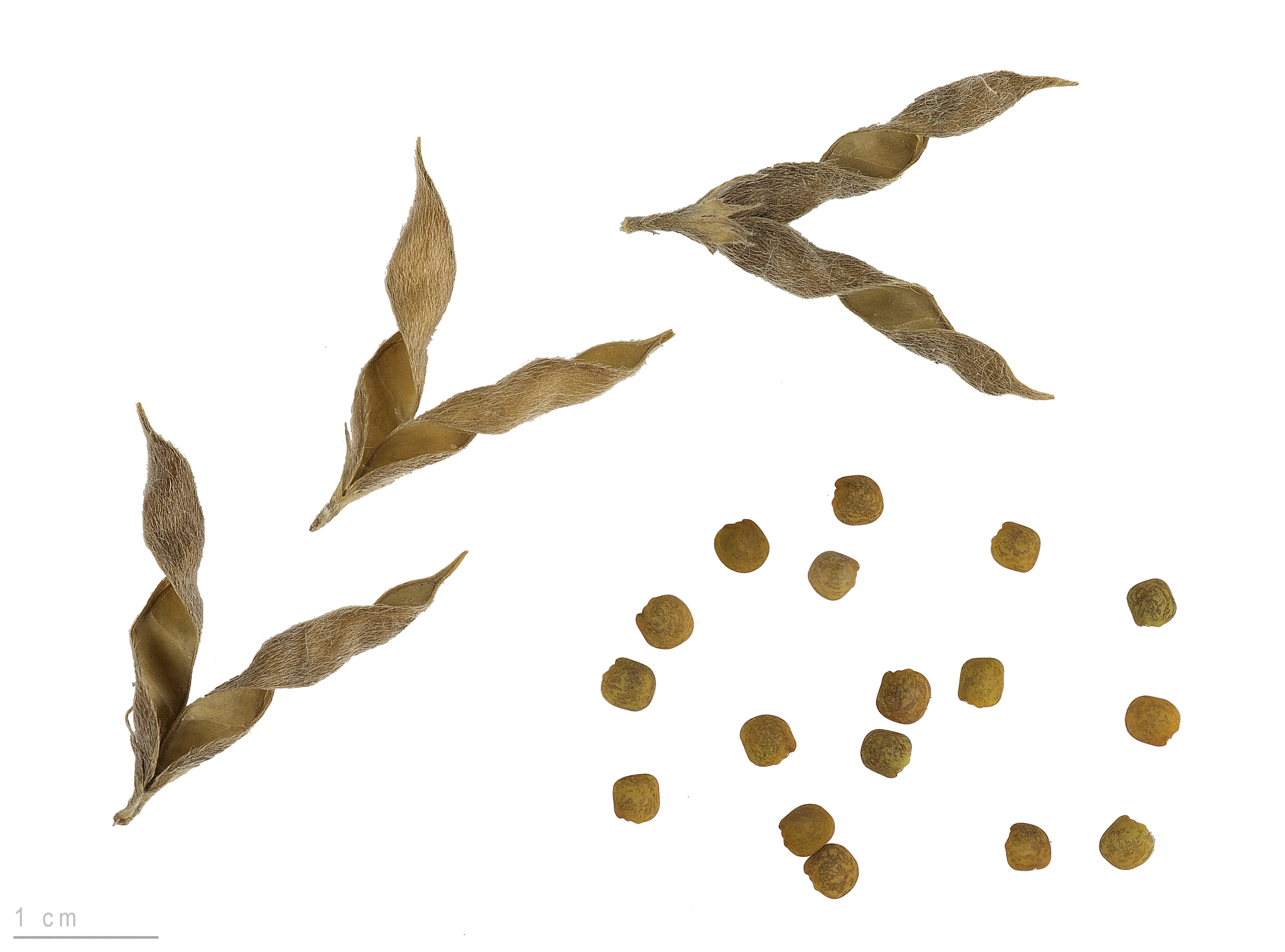
Seed pods and seeds

== Subtaxa ==
The following subspecies are accepted:

• Argyrolobium zanonii subsp. zanonii

• Argyrolobium zanonii subsp. fallax (Ball) Greuter

• Argyrolobium zanonii subsp. grandiflorum (Boiss. & Reut.) Greuter

• Argyrolobium zanonii subsp. stipulaceum (Ball) Greuter
