= Sainte-Menehould =

- Commune
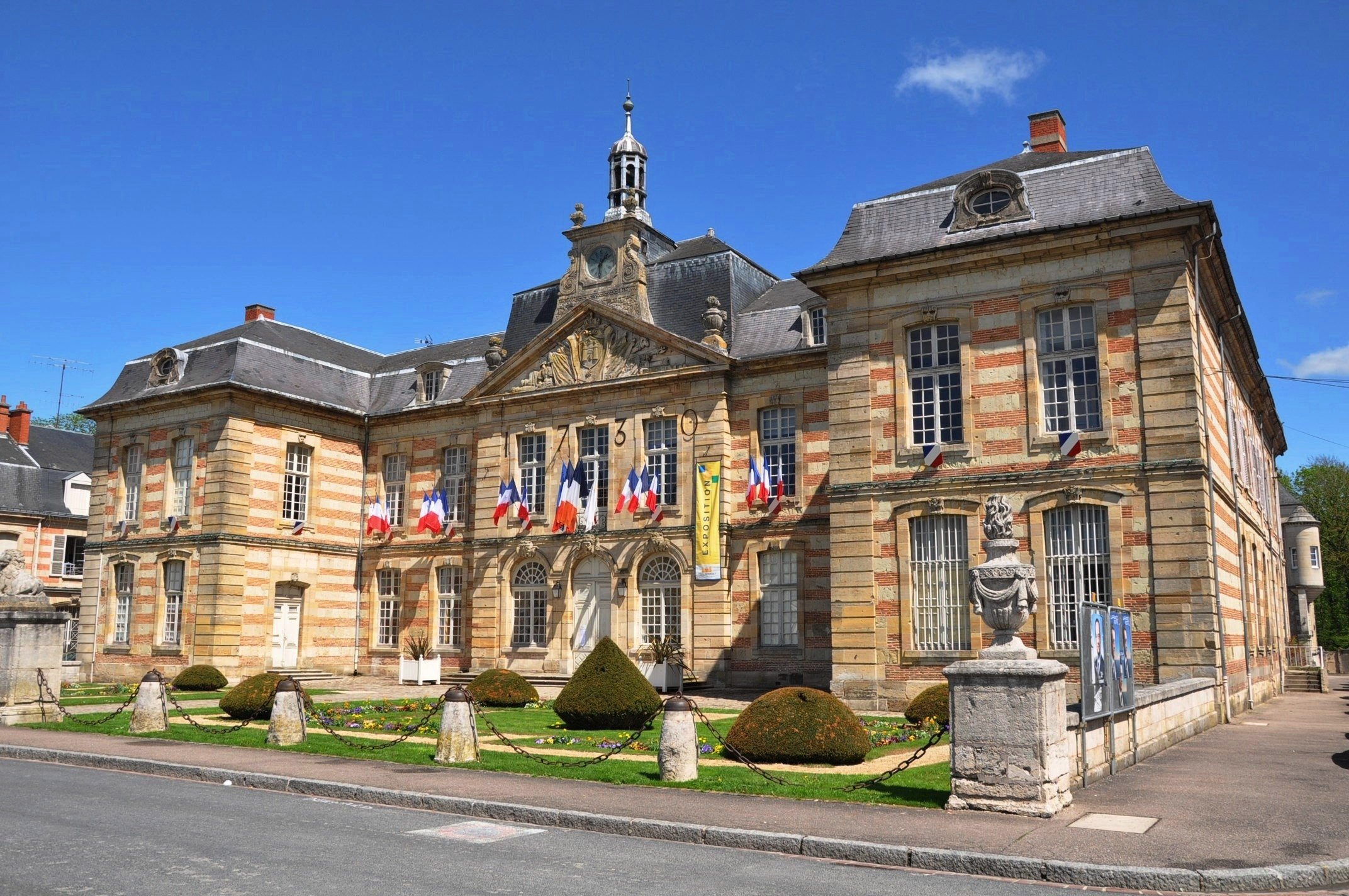
- The town hall

- Coat of arms
- Location of Sainte-Menehould
- Location within France Location within Grand Est
- Coordinates: 49°05′00″N 4°54′00″E
- Country: France
- Region: Grand Est
- Department: Marne
- Arrondissement: Châlons-en-Champagne
- Canton: Argonne Suippe et Vesle
- Intercommunality: Argonne Champenoise

Government
  - Mayor (2020–2026): Bertrand Courot
- Area^{1}: 57.11 km^{2} (22.05 sq mi)
- Highest elevation: 261 m (856 ft)
- Lowest elevation: 132 m (433 ft)
- Population (2023): 4,146
  - Density: 72.60/km^{2} (188.0/sq mi)
- Time zone: UTC+01:00 (CET)
  - Summer (DST): UTC+02:00 (CEST)
- INSEE/Postal code: 51507 /51800
- ^{1} French Land Register data, which excludes lakes, ponds, glaciers > 1 km^{2} (0.386 sq mi or 247 acres) and river estuaries.

Sainte-Menehould (French pronunciation: [sɛ̃t mənu] or locally [sɛ̃t meneuld]) is a commune in the Marne department in north-eastern France. It was the subprefecture of the arrondissement of Sainte-Menehould until its abolition in April 2017.

== History ==
Dom Pérignon, the Benedictine monk who made important contributions to the production and quality of Champagne wine, and is often (erroneously) credited with its invention, was born in Sainte-Menehould around 1638.

As part of the county of Clermont-en-Argonne, Sainte-Menehould was in the Duchy of Lorraine until 1641, when the county was ceded to France; in 1648, it was granted as an appanage to Louis, le Grand Condé, effectively making it independent of Crown control.

Condé established Sainte-Menehould as his capital and fortified it in 1652, when he was leader of the 1650-1653 civil war known as the Fronde des nobles. The military engineer Vauban worked on the fortifications as a member of Condé's regiment; he changed sides when captured by a Royalist patrol in early 1653. Condé's governor, the Comte de Montal surrendered the town in November 1653, allegedly in return for a payment of 50,000 pistoles.

After his return to France in 1659, Condé retained Clermont, which remained in his family until the abolition of feudalism in France during the French Revolution in 1790. The next year, Louis XVI passed through the town during the Flight to Varennes, where he was recognized, allegedly on account of the similarity between his face and the image on the coinage. The royal party left the town before the significance of the king's recognition had been acted upon, but they were pursued along the road towards Varennes and arrested by Citizen Drouet the local postmaster.

The 18th-century French playwright Charles-Georges Fenouillot de Falbaire de Quingey (1727–1800) died in Sainte-Ménéhould.

130 years later Ste-Menehould was important in the Champagne Riots of 1910/1911.

== Population ==
Historical population
Year	Pop.	±% p.a.
1968	5,392	—
1975	5,772	+0.98%
1982	5,667	−0.26%
1990	5,177	−1.12%
1999	4,979	−0.43%
2007	4,590	−1.01%
2012	4,321	−1.20%
2017	4,120	−0.95%
2023	4,146	+0.10%
Source: INSEE

== Cuisine ==
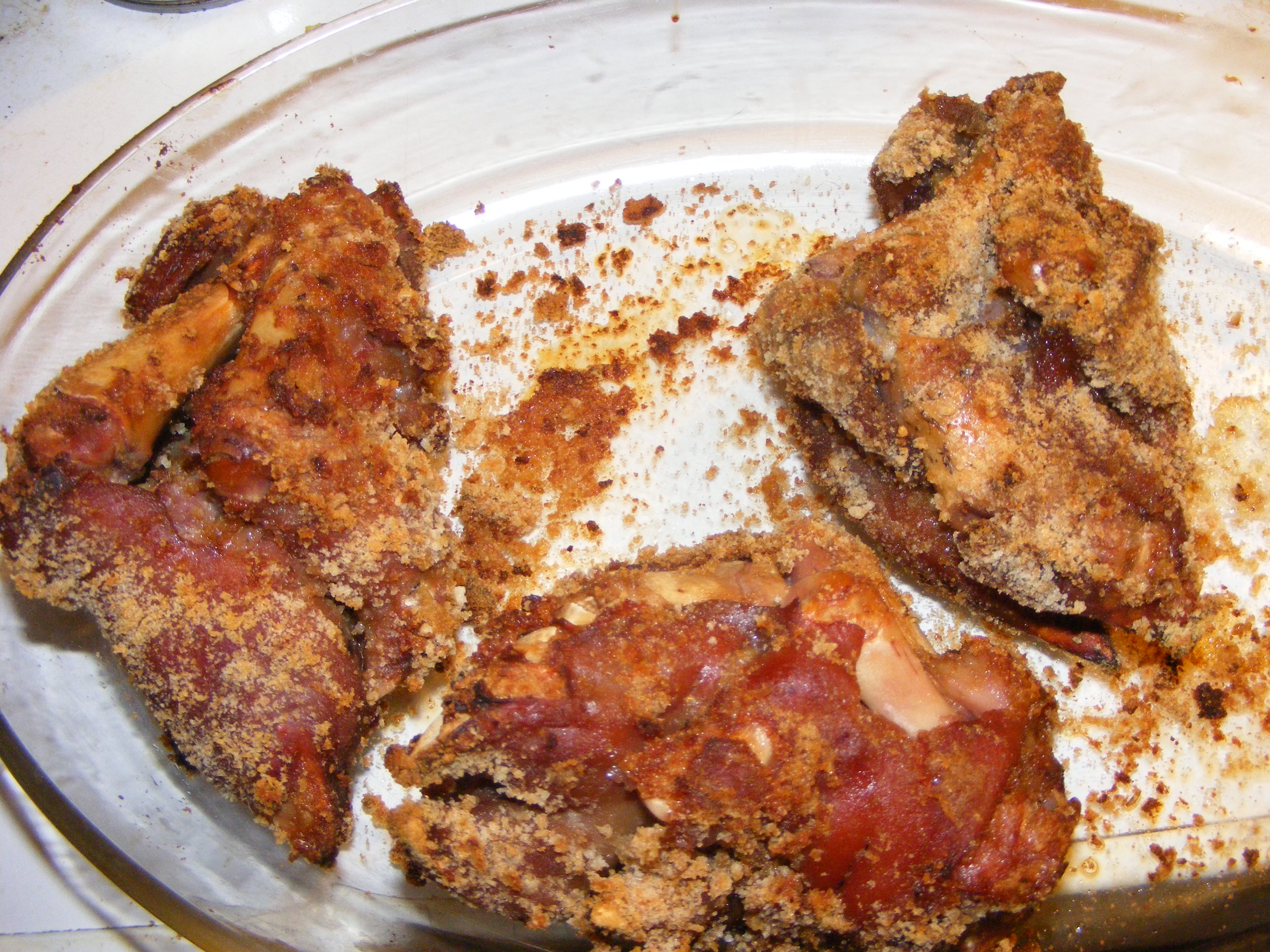
Pieds de porc à la Sainte-Menehould

The town and its several restaurants pride themselves on serving a local specialty called pied de cochon or pig's trotter à la Sainte-Menehould, which are cooked for hours, to the point of softening the bones and making them edible.

== Twinning ==
Cupar, Fife, Scotland

Cap-Pelé, NB, Canada

== See also ==
- Communes of the Marne department
- French wine
