= Charles-Georges Fenouillot de Falbaire de Quingey =

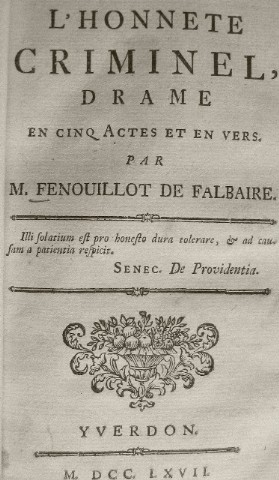
- L'Honnête Criminel by Fenouillot de Falbières (1767)
- Born: 16 July 1727; Salins-les-Bains, France
- Died: 28 October 1800 (aged 73); Sainte-Menehould, France

Charles-Georges Fenouillot de Falbaire de Quingey (16 July 1727 – 28 October 1800) was an 18th-century French playwright.

== Works ==
Theatre

- L'Honnête Criminel, ou l'Amour filial, drama in 5 acts and in verse, published in 1767 and given in Paris, by M. de Villeroy, Comédiens français, 2 February 1768; Paris, Théâtre de la Cour, Comédiens ordinaires du Roi, 10 July 1769. Read online
- Les Deux Avares, comédie en 2 actes, mêlée d'ariettes, Fontainebleau, in front of His Majesty, 27 October and 7 November 1770; Paris, Comédie Italienne, 6 December 1770
- Les Jammabos, ou Les moines japonois, tragédie dédiée aux mânes de Henri IV, et suivie de remarques historiques (1779) Read online
- Le Fabricant de Londres, drame en 5 actes et en prose, Paris, Comédie-Française, 12 January 1771
- Sémire et Mélide ou le Navigateur, Brussels, Grand Théâtre de la Monnaie, 27 September 1773
- L'École des mœurs, ou les Suites du libertinage, drame en 5 actes et en vers, Paris, Comédie-Française, 13 May 1776
- L'Honnête Homme, ou L'Innocence reconnue, drame en cinq actes & en vers (1790) Read online

Varia

- Avis aux gens de lettres contre les prétensions des libraires (1770) Read online
- Œuvres de M. de Falbaire de Quingey (2 volumes, 1787)
- La Rencontre d'auberge, ou le déjeuner breton (1789)
- Mémoire adressé au Roi et à l'Assemblée nationale, sur quelques abus et particulièrement contre une vexation de M. Doüet de La Boullaye (1789)
- Mémoire de l'auteur de l'Honnête criminel contre les Comédiens français ordinaires du roi, suivi de la délibération du comité des auteurs dramatiques (1790)
- Lettre adressée le 3 septembre 1790 à M. Necker, et suivie de quelques réflexions, tant sur sa retraite que sur la continuation de l'existence ministérielle de M. Lambert, encore à présent contrôleur général des finances (1790)
