= Catherine M. Sama =

Catherine M. Sama is a professor of Italian at the University of Rhode Island. Her research focuses on Early Modern and 18th-Century Italian Women Writers, Correspondence Networks, The Italian Enlightenment, Italian Women Artists, and Gender Studies. In 2013 she was a recipient of the National Endowment for the Humanities Research Fellowship. She also serves as a board member of the URI Center for the Humanities. She has edited the work and written a biography of the 18th-century Italian writer Elisabetta Caminèr Turra.

== Education ==
Sama earned her BA from the University of Virginia in 1985, where she majored in French and minored in Italian. She earned her PhD from Brown University in 1995. She also serves as a board member of the URI Center for the Humanities.

== Selected publications ==
- Italy's Eighteenth Century: Gender and Culture in the Age of the Grand Tour. ISBN 0804759049
- Elisabetta Caminer Turra, Selected Writings of an Eighteenth-Century Venetian Woman of Letters. ISBN 0226817687
- "On Canvas and on the Page: Women Shaping Culture in Eighteenth-Century Venice", in Italy's Eighteenth Century: Gender and Culture in the Age of the Grand Tour, edited by Paula Findlen, Wendy Roworth, and Catherine M. Sama (Stanford: Stanford University Press, 2009), 125-150; 383-393.
- "Luisa Bergalli e le sorelle Carriera: un rapporto d'amicizia e di collaborazione professionale", in Luisa Bergalli poetessa drammaturga traduttrice critica letteraria, edited by Adriana Chemello (Mirano-Venice: Eidos, 2008), 59-75.
- "Liberty, Equality, Frivolity! An Italian Critique of Fashion Periodicals". Eighteenth-Century Studies vol. 37, no. 3 (2004): 389-414.
- "Becoming Visible: a Biography of Elisabetta Caminer Turra (1751-96) During Her Formative Years". Studi veneziani N.S. LXIII (2002): 349-388.

== Selected honors and awards ==
- 2006-2007: URI Center for the Humanities Sabbatical Fellowship
- 2008: URI Center for the Humanities Visiting Scholar Grant, for the visit of Professor Antonia Arslan.
- 2008: URI Center for the Humanities Faculty Research Grant
- 2013: *URI Center for the Humanities Sabbatical Fellowship
- 2013: National Endowment for the Humanities Research Fellowship
- 2017:URI Teaching Excellence Award
