= Wendy Wassyng Roworth =

American art historian

Wendy Wassyng Roworth is professor emerita of art history at the University of Rhode Island. She is a specialist in eighteenth century British and Italian art, and the art of Angelica Kauffman.

Roworth curated the exhibition "Angelica Kauffman: A continental artist in Georgian England", which was held at the Royal Pavilion Art Gallery & Museums, Brighton in 1992 and also in York. She edited the accompanying book.

She has held fellowships with the National Endowment for the Humanities and was a scholar in residence at the National Museum for Women in the Arts in Washington D.C.

== Selected publications ==
- Angelica Kauffman: A continental Artist in Georgian England. Reaktion Books, London, 1992. (ed.) ISBN 0948462418
- "Anatomy is destiny: Regarding the body in the art of Angelica Kauffman", in Femininity and masculinity in eighteenth-century art and culture. Edited by Gillian Perry & Michael Rossington. Manchester University Press, Manchester, 1994. ISBN 9780719042287
- "Painting for profit and pleasure: Angelica Kauffman and the art business in Rome", Eighteenth-Century Studies, Volume 29, Number 2, Winter 1995–96. pp. 225–228.
- "Documenting Angelica Kauffman's life and art", Eighteenth-Century Studies, Volume 37, Number 3, Spring 2004, pp. 478–482.
- "Pulling Parrhasius's curtain: Trickery and fakery in the Roman art world" in Richard Wrigley (ed.) Regarding romantic Rome, Peter Lang, 2007.
- Italy's Eighteenth Century: Gender and culture in the age of the Grand Tour. Stanford University Press, Stanford, 2009. (edited by Paula Findlen and Catherine M. Sama) ISBN 9780804759045
