= Raworth =

Raworth is a surname. Notable people with the surname include:

- Alfred Raworth (1882–1967), electrical engineer to the Southern Railway (Great Britain) in the 1940s
- Kate Raworth (born 1970), British economist
- Sophie Raworth (born 1968), English newsreader and journalist
- Tom Raworth (1938–2017), British poet and visual artist
