= Polhillia =

Scientific classification
- Kingdom: Plantae
- Clade: Tracheophytes
- Clade: Angiosperms
- Clade: Eudicots
- Clade: Rosids
- Order: Fabales
- Family: Fabaceae
- Subfamily: Faboideae
- Tribe: Genisteae
- Genus: Polhillia; C.H.Stirt. (1986)

Species
- 11; see text

Genus of legumes

Polhillia is a genus of flowering plants in the family Fabaceae. It includes 11 species of shrubs and herbs native to the Cape Provinces of South Africa. They grow in Mediterranean-climate renosterveld (shrubland) and scrub-grassland, typically in heavy soils. The genus belongs to subfamily Faboideae.

== Species ==
Polhillia comprises the following species:

- Polhillia brevicalyx (C.H.Stirt.) B.-E.van Wyk & A.L.Schutte
- Polhillia connata (Harv.) C.H.Stirt.
- Polhillia curtisiae C.H.Stirt. & Muasya
- Polhillia connatum (Harv.) C.H.Stirt.
- Polhillia fortunata du Preez
- Polhillia groenewaldii du Preez
- Polhillia ignota Boatwr.
- Polhillia involucrata (Thunb.) B.-E.van Wyk & A.L.Schutte
- Polhillia obsoleta (Harv.) B.-E.van Wyk
- Polhillia pallens C.H.Stirt.
- Polhillia stirtoniana du Preez
- Polhillia xairuensis du Preez
