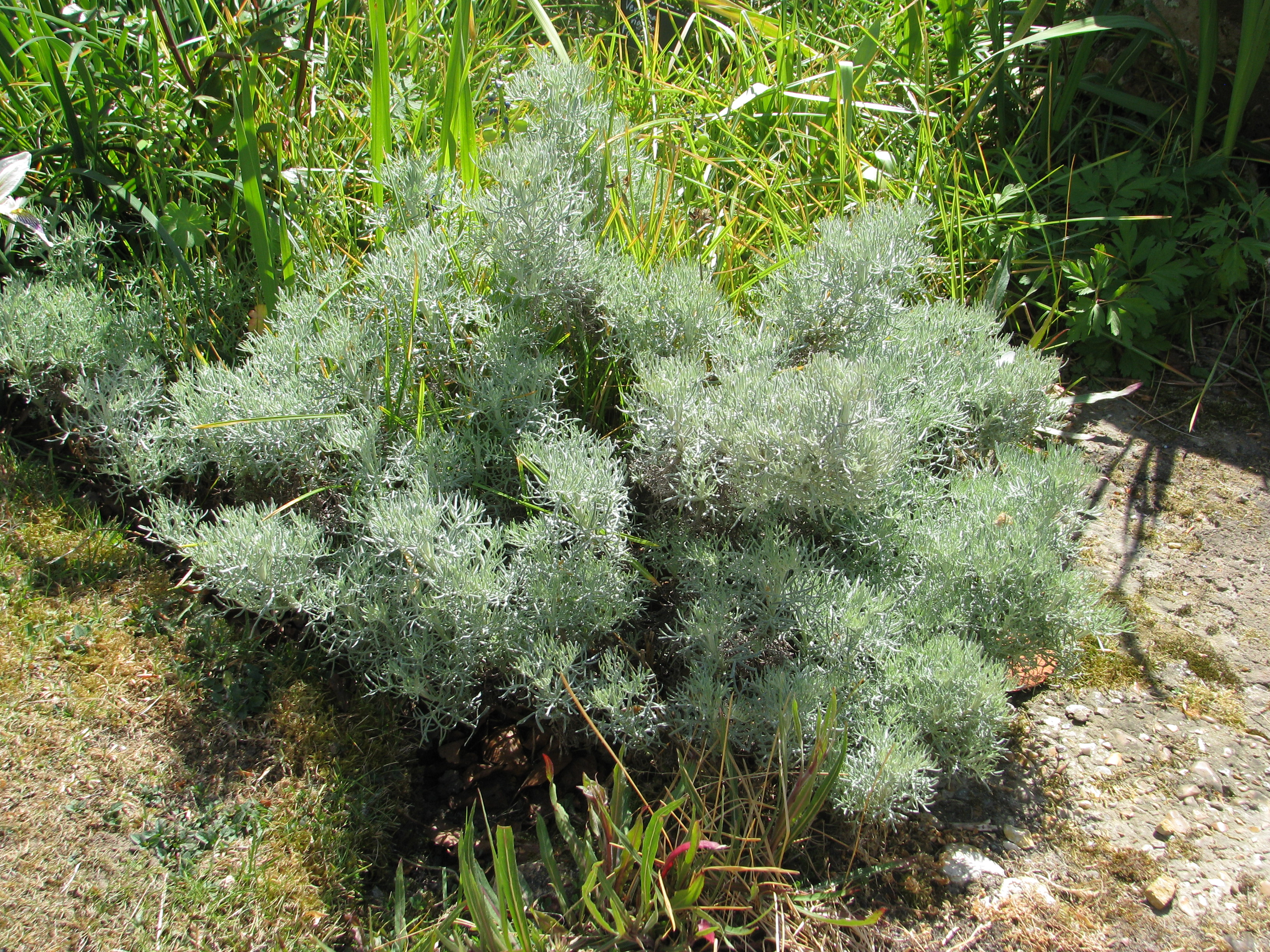
- Artemisia alba 'Canescens'

Scientific classification
- Kingdom: Plantae
- Clade: Embryophytes
- Clade: Tracheophytes
- Clade: Angiosperms
- Clade: Eudicots
- Clade: Asterids
- Order: Asterales
- Family: Asteraceae
- Genus: Artemisia
- Species: A. alba

Binomial name
- Artemisia alba Turra

Synonyms
- Absinthium viridiflorum Besser

= Artemisia alba =

Species of flowering plant

Artemisia alba, called white mugwort, white wormwood, white artemisia, or camphor southernwood, is a species of Artemisia native to Spain, France, Belgium, Italy, Sicily, the Czech Republic, Slovakia, Hungary, Romania, and the Balkans. Its currently unrecognized subtaxon Artemisia alba 'Canescens' has gained the Royal Horticultural Society's Award of Garden Merit.

Artemisia alba 'Canescens', one of the two named cultivars widely sold in UK is not an easy plant to grow in pots. It is a lovely plant but susceptible to erratic summer watering. It dislikes drying out of the root system or waterlogging. The other widely used UK cultivar the green camphor scented southernwood A. alba 'Camphorata' is much more tolerant of difficult conditions. (Ref Dr John Twibell, National Collection of Artemisia, Sidmouth UK.)

== Subspecies ==
The following subspecies are currently accepted:

- Artemisia alba subsp. alba
- Artemisia alba subsp. chitachensis
- Artemisia alba subsp. glabrescens (Willk.) Valdés Berm.
- Artemisia alba subsp. kabylica (Chabert) Greuter
