= Antonio Turra =

Italian physician and botanist (1730–1796)

Antonio Turra (25 March, 1730 - 6 September 1796) was an Italian physician and botanist.

Antonio was born in Vicenza but studied medicine in the University of Padua. His Venetian wife, Elisabetta Caminer, published biographical entries in a contemporary encyclopedia. Antonio set up a printing house in 1780 in Vicenza. Most of Antonio's publications were botanical treatises. He was honored with memberships in scientific societies throughout Italy and Europe.

== Works ==
- Catalogous plantarum horti Corneliani methodo sexuali dispositus anno MDCCLXXI, atque ab Antonio Turra elaboratus
- Vegetabilia Italiae indígena, methodo linneiano disposita
- Florae italicae prodromus, catalog of around 1700 Italian species, classified always following the method of Linnaeus, to which he added the supplement Insecta vicentina.
- De' modi di procurare la moltiplicazione de' bestiami

The standard author abbreviation Turra is used to indicate this person as the author when citing a botanical name.
