= Souain experiment =

Souain prototype
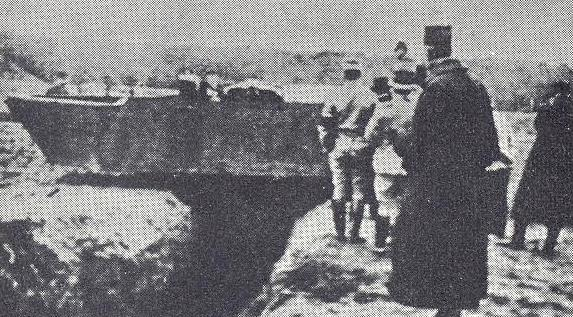
- The Souain prototype crossing a trench, on 9 December 1915.
- Type: Prototype Tank
- Place of origin: (France) French Third Republic

Service history
- In service: December 1915 (experimental)

Specifications
- Engine: gasoline internal combustion engine

The Souain experiment was a French military experiment using a Baby Holt Caterpillar, on the former battlefield of Souain, in northeastern France, on 9 December 1915. The experiment was a decisive influence on the French tank programme and initiated the design and order of the two French operational tanks, the Saint-Chamond and Schneider CA1.

== Background ==
The immobility of the trench warfare characterizing the First World War led to a need for a powerfully armed military engine that would be at the same time protected from enemy fire and could move on the extremely irregular terrain of battlefields. This led to numerous attempts at designing an effective all-terrain armoured vehicle.

== Caterpillar experiments ==
In January 1915, the French vehicle and armaments manufacturer Schneider & Co. sent out its chief designer, Eugène Brillié, to investigate tracked tractors from the American Holt Company, at that time participating in a test programme in England, for a project of mechanical wire-cutting machines of the Breton-Pretot type. On his return Brillié, who had earlier been involved in designing armoured cars for Spain, convinced the company management to initiate studies on the development of a Tracteur blindé et armé (armoured and armed tractor), based on the Baby Holt chassis, two of which were ordered.

Experiments on the Holt caterpillar tracks started in May 1915 at the Schneider plant with a 75 hp wheel-directed model and the 45 hp integral caterpillar Baby Holt, showing the superiority of the latter. On 16 June, new experiments followed in front of the President of the French Republic, and on 10 September for Commander Ferrus, an officer who had been involved in the study (and ultimate abandonment) of the Levavasseur tank project in 1908.

== Souain experiment ==
Finally, a Baby Holt caterpillar was demonstrated at Souain on 9 December 1915, to the French Army, with the participation of commandant Ferrus, lieutenant Charles Fouché, General Philippe Pétain.

Souain was a former battlefield with rough terrain and trenches, recently recaptured from the Germans, and offered perfect conditions to test the qualities of the new tank prototype.

The results of the Baby Holt caterpillar were excellent, displaying remarkable mobility in the difficult terrain of Souain. The length of the Baby Holt however appeared to be too short to bridge German trenches, justifying the development of longer caterpillar tracks for the French tank project. The Souain prototype could effectively bridge shell holes and trenches up to 1 meter in width, with a maximum limit of 1.20 meters, but required some support to bridge wider gaps, rendering it unsatisfactory as such. According to the official report "the machine can only cross trench lines if some basic passageway across the trenches is prepared for it"

== See also ==
- History of the tank
