= Schneider CA1 =

French tank developed during WWI

Schneider CA
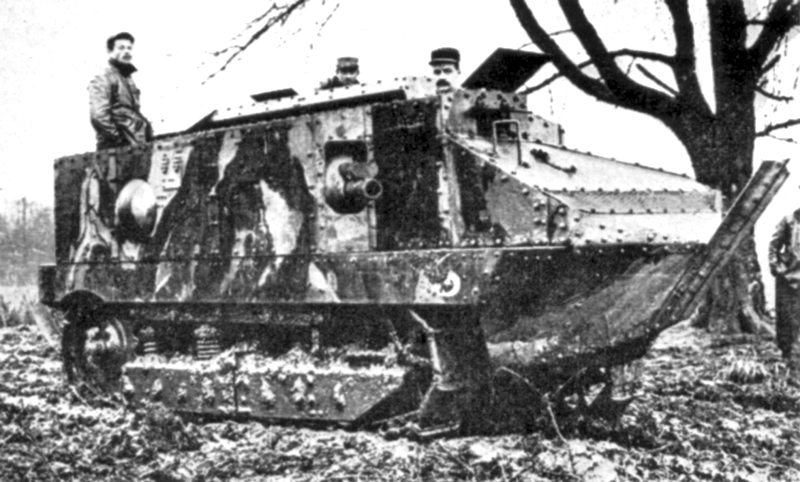
- Schneider tank
- Type: Medium tank
- Place of origin: French Third Republic

Service history
- In service: 1916–1918 (France); 1921–1936 (Spain)
- Used by: France; Kingdom of Italy; Spain; Fengtian Clique
- Wars: World War I Rif War; Warlord Era; Spanish Civil War

Production history
- Designer: Schneider
- Manufacturer: SOMUA
- No. built: 400

Specifications
- Mass: 13.6 tonnes
- Length: 6.32 m (20 ft 9 in)
- Width: 2.05 m (6 ft 9 in)
- Height: 2.30 m (7 ft 7 in)
- Crew: 6
- Armor: 11 + 5.5 mm (0.43 + 0.22 in) spaced
- Main armament: 75 mm Blockhaus Schneider
- Secondary armament: 2×8 mm Hotchkiss M1914 machine guns
- Engine: Schneider 4-cylinder petrol 60 hp (45 kW)
- Power/weight: 4 hp/tonne
- Suspension: Coil spring
- Operational range: 30/80 km
- Maximum speed: 8.1 km/h (5.0 mph)

The Schneider CA 1 (originally named the Schneider Char d'Assault) was the first French tank, developed during the First World War and manufactured by SOMUA.

The Schneider was inspired by the need to overcome the stalemate of trench warfare which on the Western Front prevailed during most of the Great War. It was designed specifically to open passages for the infantry through barbed wire and then to suppress German machine gun nests. After a first concept by Jacques Quellennec devised in November 1914, the type was developed from May 1915 onwards by engineer Eugène Brillié, paralleling British development of tanks the same year. Colonel Jean Baptiste Eugène Estienne in December 1915 began to urge for the formation of French armoured units, leading to an order in February 1916 for four hundred Schneider CA tanks, which were manufactured by SOMUA, a subsidiary of Schneider located in a suburb of Paris, between September 1916 and August 1918.

Like most early tanks, the Schneider was built like a simple armoured box, without compartmentalisation of the inner space. It lacked a turret, with the main armament, a short 75 mm cannon, in a sponson on the right side. By later standards it would therefore have been an assault gun instead of a tank. The vehicle was considered a very imperfect design, because of a poor layout, insufficient firepower, a cramped interior and inferior mobility due to an overhanging nose section, which had been designed to crush through the belts of barbed wire but in practice caused the tank to get stuck. Improved designs were almost immediately initiated but the production of these, the Schneider CA 2, CA 3 and CA 4, was eventually cancelled.

The Schneider CA 1 tanks were widely used in combat during the last war years. Their first action on 16 April 1917 was largely a failure, the tank units suffering heavy losses, but later engagements were more successful. In 1918 the Schneider tanks played an important role in halting the German spring offensive and breaking the German front in the French summer offensives. They were active until the end of September 1918, less than two months before the Armistice of 11 November 1918, their numbers having dropped considerably due to attrition. After the war the surviving tanks were mostly rebuilt as utility vehicles but six Schneider tanks were deployed by Spain in the Rif War in Morocco and the type saw its last action in the beginning of the Spanish Civil War.

== Development ==
=== Armoured caterpillar tractor development ===
Before the First World War, mechanic Charles Marius Fouché cooperated with engineer Édouard Quellennec and the latter's son Jacques Quellennec to adapt existing caterpillar tractors to the conditions of Egyptian and French farming, among them the Holt Model 75. In this context in 1914 contacts were made with engineer Eugène Brillié of Schneider & Co. to adapt the Castéran Flexible Track Tractor. When that year war broke out, Jacques Quellennec was drafted as an infantry sergeant, witnessed most men of his unit being slaughtered during the First Battle of the Marne and was then severely wounded at the end of October. While recovering, he devised plans for an armoured tractor armed with a machine-gun and capable of destroying German machine-gun nests. Many in this period had comparable ideas but contrary to most, Quellennec had excellent contacts. Fouché had become a second lieutenant with the Grand Parc Automobile de Réserve of the Service Automobile, the Army branch responsible for motorisation, and Brillié was chief designer with one of France's main arms manufacturers. Early December, Quellennec met Fouché in Paris and both then went to Brillié to present drawings of a tracked armoured fighting vehicle. During a second visit Quellennec urged Brillié to bring over two Holt Model 75 tractors, at that time present in Tunisia, to France in order to perform the first trials. Brillié showed himself less than enthusiastic about the idea, objecting there would be not enough room on a tractor for both crew and armament. In February 1915, Quellennec was sent to an air force training base and tasked Fouché with trying to convince Brillié, without much apparent success.

Meanwhile, the Schneider company had been given the order to develop heavy artillery tractors in January 1915. On 30 January it sent out its chief designer, Brillié, to investigate tracked tractors from the American Holt Company, at that time participating in a test programme at Aldershot in England. On his return, Brillié, who had earlier been involved in designing armoured cars for Spain, apparently without mentioning being influenced in this by Quellennec, convinced the company management to initiate studies on the development of an armoured fighting vehicle, based on the Baby Holt chassis, two of which were ordered. The type was intended to be sold to the French Cavalry.

Experiments on the Holt caterpillar tracks started in May 1915 at the Schneider plant with a 75 hp wheel-directed model and the 45 hp integral caterpillar Baby Holt, showing the superiority of the latter. The Castéran and the Killen-Strait Tractor were also tested but rejected. Work was now begun on an auto-mitrailleuse blindée à chenilles ("tracked armoured self-propelled machine gun"). On 16 June, new experiments followed in front of the President of the Republic Raymond Poincaré, leading to the order of six, later expanded to ten, armoured tracked vehicles for further testing. The type was since July called a machine offensive à chenilles ("tracked offensive machine") and was based on the Baby Holt with a suspension that was to be thirty centimetres lengthened. In August drawings were made of what was now designated the tracteur blindé et armé ("armoured and armed tractor"). In September 1915 the Schneider programme was combined with an official one for the development of an armoured barbed wire cutter by engineer and Member of Parliament Jules-Louis Breton, the Breton-Prétot machine. Ten of the fifteen available Baby Holt vehicles were to be armoured and fitted with the wire cutter of which ten systems had been ordered on 7 August. This involved the Service Automobile in the project. On 10 September, new experiments were made for Commandant L. Ferrus, an officer who had been involved in the study (and ultimate rejection) of the Levavasseur tank project in 1908.

=== The Souain experiment ===
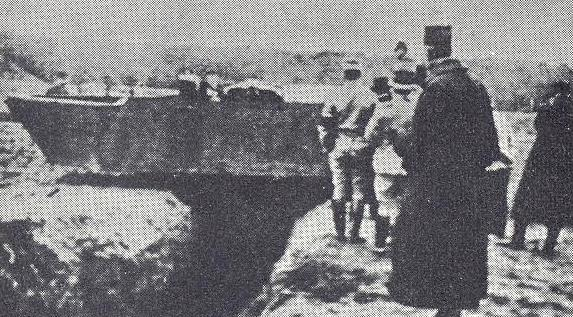
The Souain prototype crossing a trench, on 9 December 1915.

On 9 December 1915 in the Souain experiment, a Schneider prototype armoured tank, a Baby Holt chassis with boiler-plate armour, was demonstrated to the French Army. Among the onlookers were General Philippe Pétain, and Colonel Jean Baptiste Eugène Estienne — an artillery man and engineer held in very high regard throughout the army for his unmatched technological and tactical expertise. The results of the prototype tank were, at least according to Estienne, excellent, displaying remarkable mobility in the difficult terrain of the former battlefield of Souain. The length of the Baby Holt however appeared to be too short to bridge German trenches, justifying the development of longer caterpillar tracks for the French tank project. For Estienne the vehicle shown embodied concepts about armoured fighting vehicles which he had been advocating since August 1914. Already on 1 December Estienne had proposed to the French GHQ the use of tracked armoured tractors to move infantry, equipment and cannon over the battlefield, having performed some trials with British caterpillar tractors. On 11 December Estienne let a certain lieutenant Thibier draw a sketch of two conceptions: the one of a Baby Holt chassis fitted at the front and the back with auxiliary rollers, to improve the trench-crossing capacity; the other of an elongated suspension protected by side armour.

=== Estienne's proposal ===
On 12 December Estienne presented to the High Command, represented by General Maurice Janin, a plan to form an armoured force equipped with tracked vehicles. In it he formulated some specifications. The machines should be twelve tonnes in weight, protected by fifteen to twenty millimetres of armour. The dimensions of the vehicles were indicated as four metres long, 2.6 metres wide and 1.6 metres high. An engine of eighty horsepower should allow for a maximum speed of nine kilometres per hour and a low speed of three. The vehicle should be able to cross a two metres wide trench and tow a seven tonne armoured sled holding twenty men with arms and equipment. Its armament should consist of two machine guns and a 37 mm gun, able to pierce the armour shields of enemy machine guns. The crew would total four men.

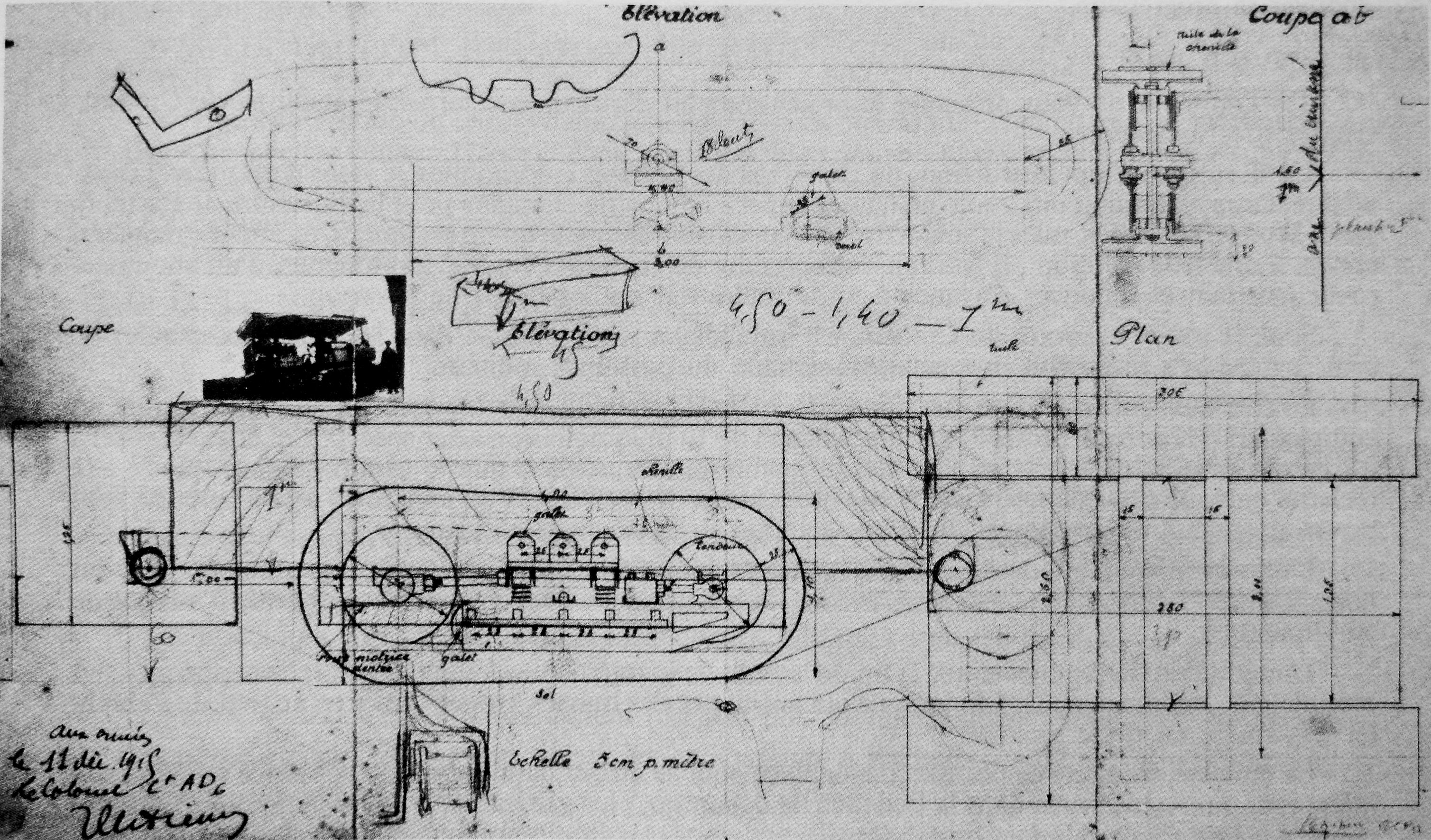
Tank drawings ordered by Colonel Estienne right after the Souain experiment, drawn on 11 December 1915. The plans are basically based on the 45 hp Holt caterpillar, but a little picture of the Holt Model 75 is attached

On 20 December Estienne, on leave in Paris, together with Ferrus visited Louis Renault in Boulogne-Billancourt, in vain trying to convince the car producer to get involved in the production of the new weapon system. Later the same day they received Brillié who disclosed the amount of work already done by Schneider on its project. The August order of ten vehicles had been confirmed on 7 December; on the 15th the official contract was signed. On 22 December, the Schneider company began to prepare for armoured vehicle production. It indicated it had the capacity to manufacture in total three hundred to four hundred units in 1916. At this point the Schneider project envisioned a ten tonne vehicle, armed by a 75 mm gun, protected by 10 mm chrome steel and powered by a specially developed 50 HP engine allowing for a top speed of 7 km/h. On the 27th, the paper design was adapted to incorporate some of Estienne's ideas; because the original drawings have not been rediscovered, it is impossible to determine to what extent this was done. The same day new tests were held with the Baby Holt tractor at Vincennes; the next day Estienne further elaborated his proposal at the GHQ. The prototype was fitted with extensions at the front and rear end to improve its trench-crossing capacity and successfully tested on 5 January 1916.

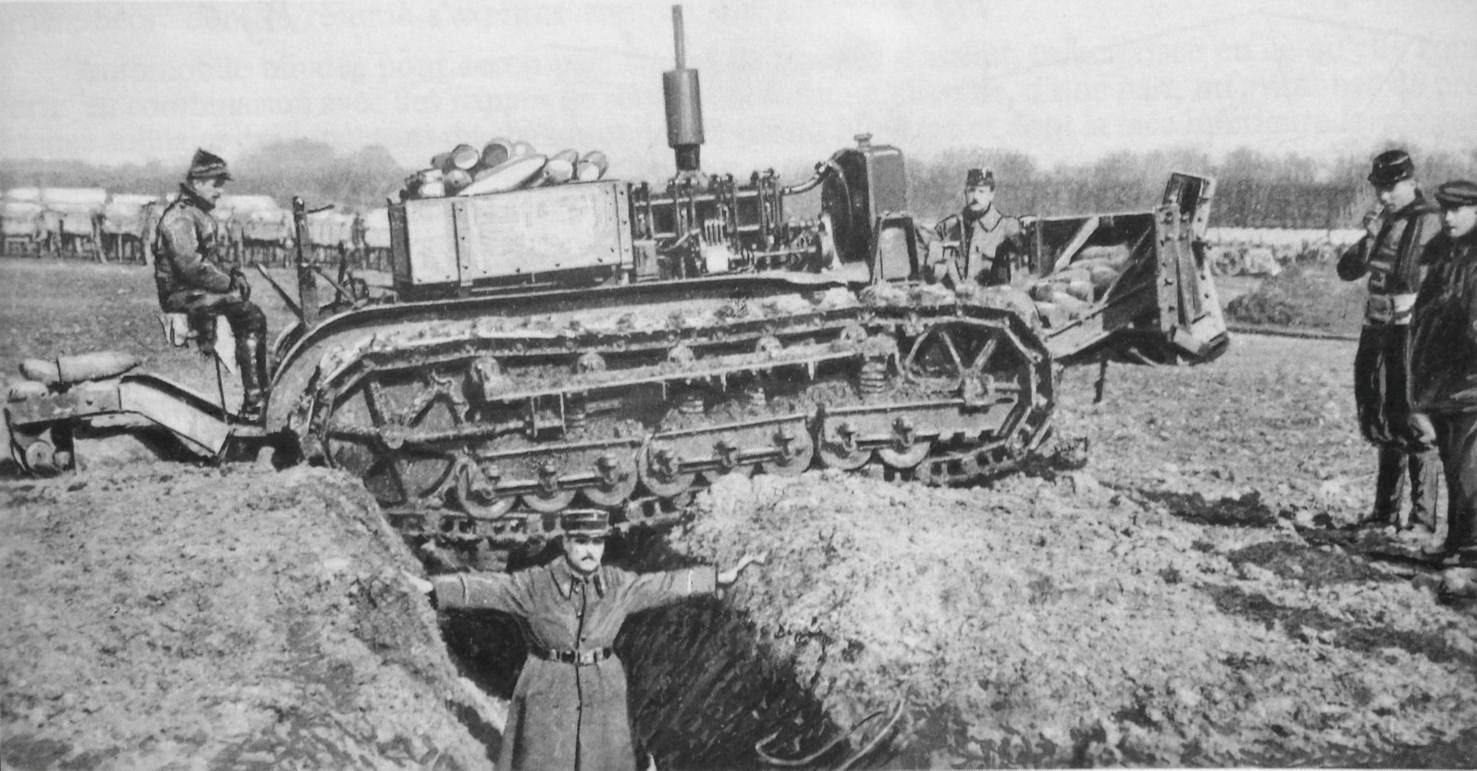
Final caterpillar test on 21 February 1916, before the mass order of the Schneider CA1 tank on the 25th. The eight-wheeled vehicle is shown. The man spanning the trench with his arms is Fouché.

Estienne's plan met with approbation from Commander-in-chief Joffre, who on 7 January 1916 proposed the production of an "offensive engine" to Minister of Armaments Albert Thomas. On the 18th Estienne was received by Joffre personally to clarify his ideas. In a letter to the ministry dated 31 January 1916 Joffre desired the production of four hundred tanks of the type suggested by Estienne. Although there had been a long prior development phase with the Schneider company, Estienne's decisive role in getting the Schneider vehicle produced in mass has earned him a traditional position in history as the creator of the first French tank. This is put into perspective by his limited involvement in its technical design; as early as January 1916 the actual completion was entrusted to a ministerial bureau headed by General Léon Augustin Jean Marie Mourret, director of the Army automobile service. Mourret did not closely cooperate with Estienne, who was essentially excluded from decisions of a technical nature.

In January it was decided to manufacture a longer suspension. Schneider had, already before 9 December 1915, devised a system thirty centimetres longer with seven road wheels instead of five. Mourret ordered to build an alternative system. Two Baby Holt tractors, part of the order of fifteen by Schneider on 21 September 1915, and property of the French State, were during two weeks from 2 February onwards in an army workshop combined into a single elongated vehicle, a caterpillar offensif allongé, by Lieutenant Charles Fouché, assisted by a small team of mechanics. The workshop was in the Farman factory at Billancourt appropriated from the l'Automobilette company. It was again about a foot longer than the Schneider type, and featured three bogies with a total of eight road wheels. The new suspension system was not based on exact blueprints but improvised by private Pierre Lescudé. On 17 February the eight-wheeled system, which prototype was later designated L'appareil n° 1 Type A ("Device Number 1 Type A") was tested at Vincennes, easily crossing trenches up to 1.75 metres wide and overcoming barbed wire obstacles. On 21 February successful tests were held at Vincennes, the Schneider company providing a non-elongated Baby Holt chassis for comparison. From this it was concluded that the tank was sufficiently developed to justify a production order. On 25 February 1916 the War Ministry secretly ordered the production of four hundred tracteurs-chenilles type Schneider & Cie blindés ("tracked and armoured tractors of the Schneider type"), at a price of 56,000 French francs per vehicle. For security reasons it was pretended these were simple towing vehicles, tracteurs Estienne. The earlier order of 15 December for ten vehicles was hereby replaced. Fouché was ordered to improve the prototype, which resulted in a slightly changed L'appareil n° 1 Type B, tested on 2 March. Further changes, now including improvised side armour extending to the front in a bow, created the L'appareil n° 1 Type C or Machine Profilée which was tested on 17 March. On 27 February, Schneider had been asked to provide a first armoured superstructure made of boiler steel, which was late March placed on the eight-wheeled chassis. Pictures of this vehicle have often been presented in books as showing the "first Schneider CA prototype". However, this entire development line, even though its official order had been based on it, would not be ancestral to the Schneider tank. In the spring of 1916, for reasons that are not entirely clear, there was a fundamental falling-out between the French Army and Schneider Cie. The latter company would develop and produce its Schneider tank on the basis of its seven-wheeled chassis, which had been patented on 17 January; the Army would develop the eight-wheeled system into the Saint-Chamond heavy tank.

== Designation ==
Whereas the first order spoke of tracteurs Estienne, the factory designation of the tank was Schneider CA. The meaning of "CA" is uncertain. Later it was usually understood to mean Char d'Assaut, literally "chariot" and today the full French word for "tank". However, the "CA" part first surfaces in a Tracteur CA, as a next development step in 1916 after the Tracteur A (the lengthened Army prototype or L'appareil n° 1 Type A), Tracteur B and Tracteur C. The term char d'assaut in the meaning of "tank" was first applied by Estienne in October 1916. Sometimes a reversed order was used: Schneider AC. The combination with "char" was typically in the form of Char Schneider. A gun-towing tractor (remorqueur), based on the CA chassis and produced in 1918, was designated Schneider CD, and a prototype porteur variant of it, intended to carry a heavy artillery piece, the CD3. This would seem to indicate that the CA suffix was merely a Schneider product code similar to those used by Renault.

At the end of 1916, the type was called Schneider CA 1 to make a distinction with a derived tank project, the Schneider CA 2. In 1917 the Schneider CA 1 is also called the Schneider 1916 to distinguish it from the Schneider 1917, another name for the next tank project, the Schneider CA 3. This had its origin in a demand by Estienne on 30 January 1917 to agree on a standardised terminology. General Mourret then proposed to use the official designations Schneider Modèle 1916 and Saint-Chamond Modèle 1916.

== Description ==
The Schneider is effectively an armoured steel box on top of a caterpillar tractor. It has no turret; the main armament is a 75 mm Blockhaus Schneider "fortification gun" in a barbette in the right front corner of the tank. The right side had been chosen because the gunner had to stand to the left of the barrel to operate the gun. The cannon type was developed from a 75 mm trench mortar that had been adapted to fire from a fixed fortification position by adding a recoil compensator and a gun shield; in this configuration it weighed 210 kg (460 lb). This short-barrelled cannon had a barrel length of just 9.5 calibres. It fired the standard French HE Model 1915 75 mm shell but with a reduced propelling charge, shortening the overall length of the round from 350 mm (14 in) to 241 mm (9.5 in), allowing for a muzzle velocity of only 200 m/s (660 ft/s). The maximum range of the gun was 2,200 m (7,200 ft), the practical range was 600 m (2,000 ft) and the tank needed to close within 200 m (660 ft) of a target for precision shooting. In its mounting the gun had a traverse of 60°, a depression of −10° and an elevation of 30°. The tank carried ninety rounds for the gun stowed vertically in bins to the right of the cannon (20), extreme right rear corner (14), left of the engine (32) and left rear corner (24).

Secondary armament was two 8 mm Hotchkiss Mle 1914 machine guns in the sides of the tank in large hemispherical ballmounts, and resting on pintles. The right machine gun is, because of the room needed for the main gun, positioned more to the rear than the left one. The machine guns have a traverse of 106°, a depression of −45° and an elevation of 20°. A bin, in the extreme left corner, was for four thousand rounds of 8 mm ammunition. In 1918, in practice fifty belts, each of ninety-six rounds, were carried for a total of 4,800 rounds.

Another unusual feature is the slanted overhang of the frontal part of the chassis which has the form of a pointed nose, ending in a high, obliquely protruding steel spur. It had been designed for cutting through and crushing down German barbed wire, thus opening passages for following French infantry, originally seen as the primary function of the system. This long overhang could cause the tank to ditch itself readily. The tank is 6.32 m (20 ft 9 in) long by 2.05 m (6 ft 9 in) wide and 2.3 m (7 ft 7 in) high. There was no separation of the crew from the engine and transmission. The room available to the crew, illuminated by three small electric lights, is entered through a double door in the back of the tank and is extremely cramped. The crew consisted of a commanding officer who was also the driver; an NCO who was the gunner, two machine gunners, a loader who assisted both the cannon and the machine guns and a mechanic who doubled as a machine gun loader. Four of these six men had, at their assigned position, to crouch inside a 1.5 m (4 ft 11 in) high space between the roof and the tank's floor. They then had to stand within two narrow troughs, one, behind the driver's seat, used by the gunner and a second square one more to the back, between the suspension elements, used by the cannon loader and the two machine gunners. Most of the space however, had a height of just three feet between the roof and the covering of transmission and suspension: to load the right machine gun, the mechanic had to lie on his belly. Each Schneider tank team included three riflemen who in battle accompanied the tank. All-around protection was 11.4 mm-thick (0.45 in) steel plate, later improved by a spaced armour of 5.4/5.5 mm, raising the weight from 12.5 to 13.5 tonnes. The roof was 5.5 mm (0.22 in) armour. The plates are partly riveted; the superstructure is largely bolted.

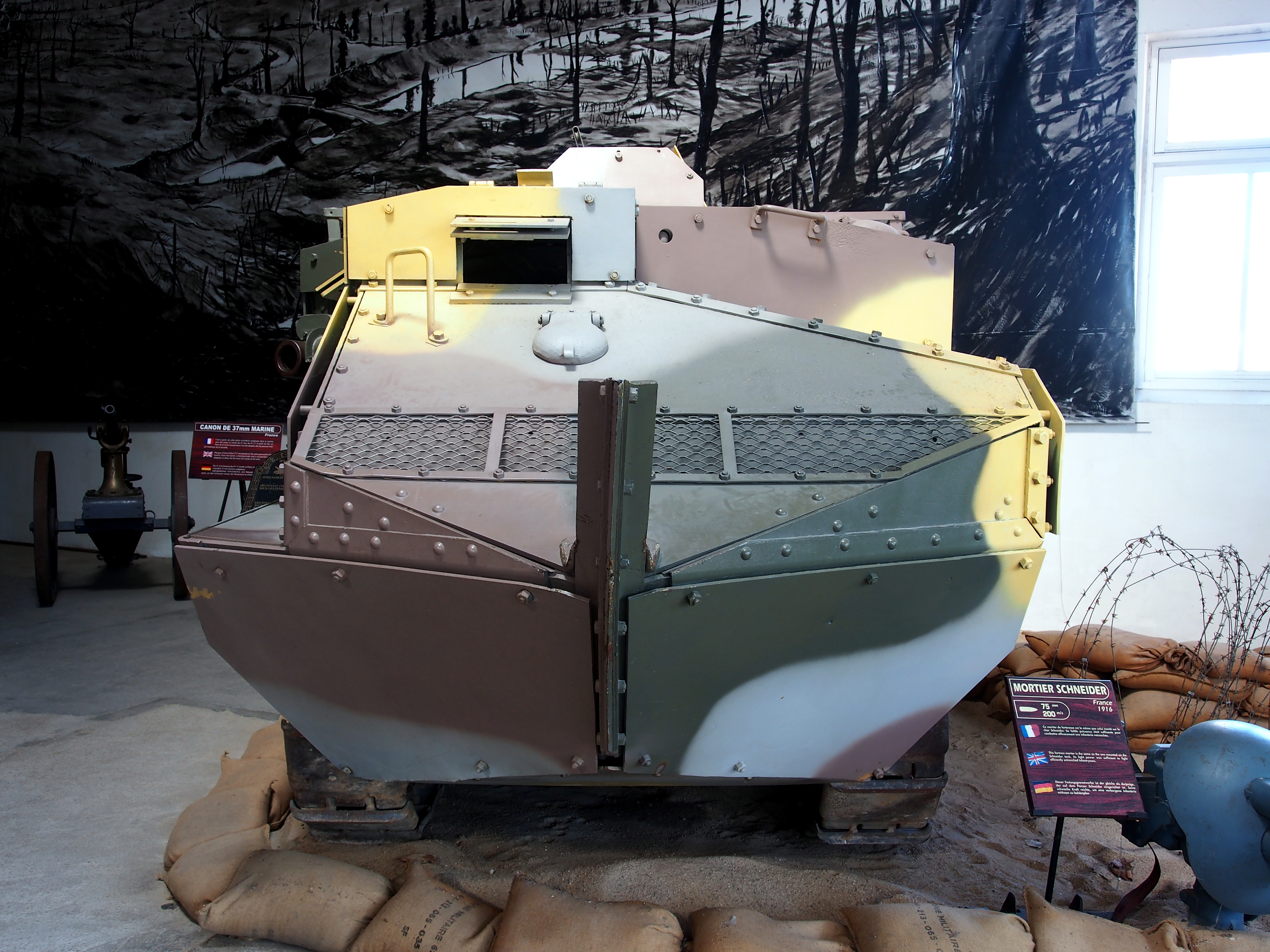
The overhanging nose section reduced mobility

The 60 hp Schneider gasoline engine and its radiator are located in the front part of the tank, to the immediate left of the driver. The four cylinder, 135mm×170mm 9,753 cc, engine was specially built for the Schneider CA. It delivered a maximum output of 60 hp (45 kW) at 1,000 rpm. The three-forward-speed gearbox, as well as the differentials, which can be engaged by brakes on the half shafts to steer the tank, are all located on the rear axle. They are linked to the engine in the front by a driveshaft and a primary clutch. A secondary clutch is coupled to each sprocket and can be decoupled for a tight turn. The main clutch and the main brakes can be engaged by pedals, the throttle by a handle. By means of a reverse device the three gears can also be applied to drive backwards. Steering was generally very tiring and there was a tendency to jump out of gear when the clutch was engaged too forcefully.

The tank's official top speed is only 8.1 km/h (5.0 mph); practical speed was 2 to 4 km/h (1.2 to 2.5 mph). At 1,000 engine rpm, the first gear equalled a speed of 2 km/h, the second 3.95 km/h, the third 6.75 km/h. At 2 km/h (1.2 mph) the Schneider could climb a slope of 55%. The capacity to overcome obstacles, limited to a parapet of about eighty centimetres, is improved by two short climbing tails, fitted to the left and right of the lower hull rear. The lower profile of the tails is curved, allowing the vehicle to gradually raise itself above a trench floor, until its centre of gravity shifts over the edge causing its hull to suddenly tumble forward. The trench-crossing capacity is about 175 centimetres. The wading capacity is eighty centimetres. Two fuel gravity-feed reservoirs placed above the engine below the right front roof and nose plate, have a total capacity of 145 litres, and allow for a practical range of about fifty kilometres, though the official range is eighty kilometres. The suspension consists of seven double road wheels attached to two bogies, the one in front carrying three, the other four. The rear bogie is sprung by two vertical coil springs, the front one larger than the rear one. The front bogies of the left and the right, each sprung by a vertical coil of narrow diameter, are connected to each other by means of a yoke-like transverse beam, itself attached to the hull bottom by two wide vertical coils springs, diminishing rolling and tilt when crossing rough terrain. Ground clearance is forty-one centimetres. There are five small return rollers. The six-spoked idler is attached to the front bogie and can thus move vertically to some degree. The sprocket, having twenty teeth, is however fixed in relation to the hull. It has a somewhat larger diameter than the idler, causing the upper track profile to slope slightly downwards to the front. The track consists of thirty-three flat links with a width of thirty-six centimetres. The ground pressure is about 0.75 kg/cm^{2}. As the traverse of the main gun was limited, it had first to be pointed in the general direction of the target by the driver-commander swivelling the entire vehicle. To facilitate this, a small rectangular frame is fitted on the right side of the nose of the tank. Looking through it, the driver had a sightline parallel to that of the cannon in a neutral position. In practice, the commander had too limited view of his surroundings through the small hatches to his left, front and right and had to put his head out of his rectangular top hatch to observe the enemy. Small rectangular hatches, fitted with a vision slit, are further present to the front of each machine-gun. The main ventilation is provided by a large skylight slit running along the midline of the hull. It is doubly roofed with the lower roof having a second slit in its top, while the higher roof has open lower sides, creating oblique oblong ventilation channels through which fresh air can be sucked in from the outside. The top roof is the highest element of the vehicle. With later production vehicles, polluted air is removed through a broad ventilation grid in the nose, having a recessed armour plate below it. To the left and the right of the skylight roof rectangular escape hatches are present in the hull top.

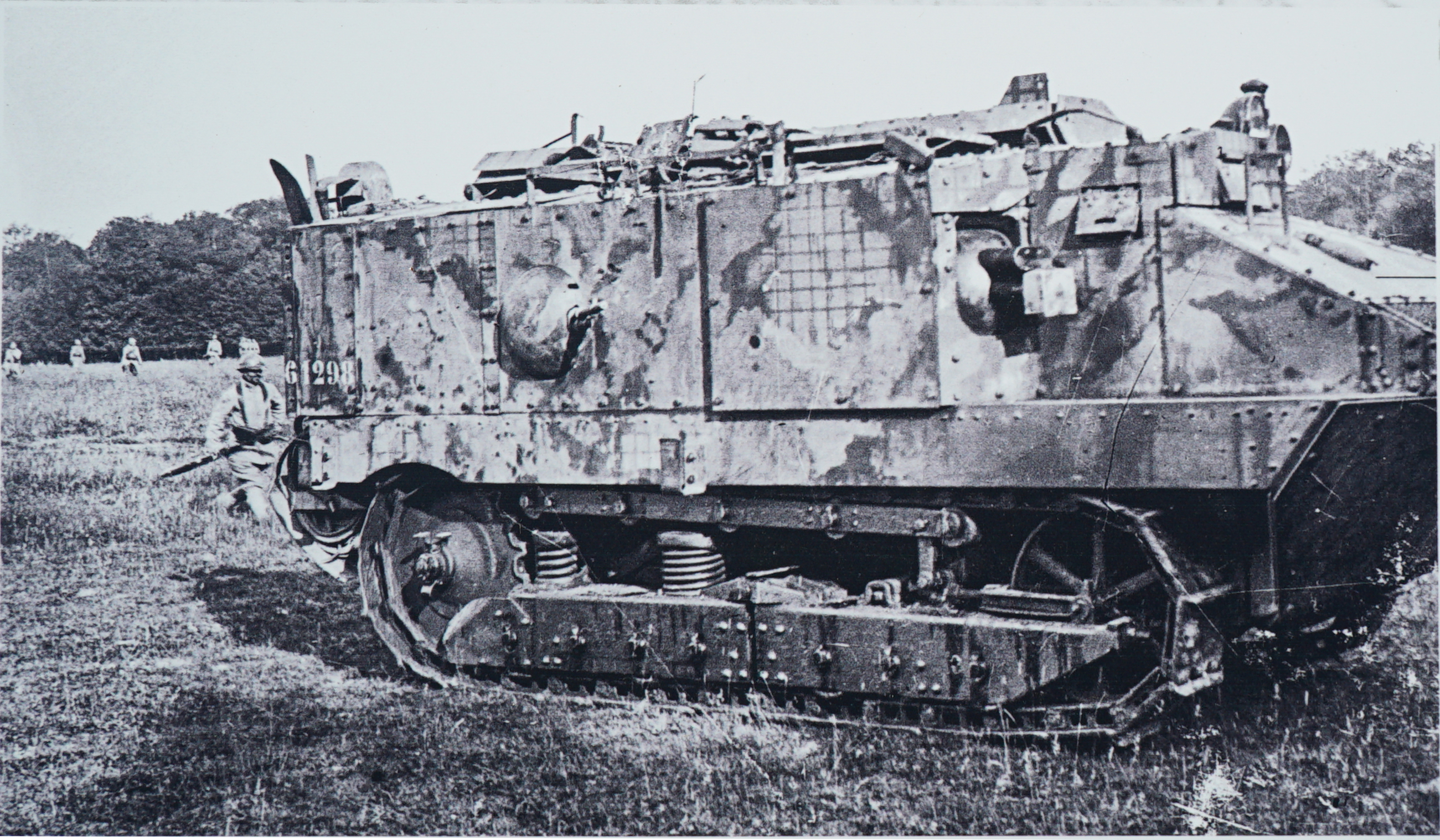
The cross-hatched pattern

The vehicles were delivered by the factory painted in the standard grey colour used by the Artillery Arm and other branches of the army often called "artillery grey". It was a rather light pearl grey shade. At first, by the Section Camouflage in the field, a specially designed complex striped flame pattern was added consisting of narrow vertical red brown, dark green and yellow ochre patches, delineated in black. This was intended to break the contours of the vehicles. To some observers, it made them seem strikingly colourful. The original grey paint was perhaps only partly covered, including it in the ensemble; an alternative interpretation of the lightest patches seen in black-and-white photographs is that it represents a light green hue. Later, when the appliqué armour was added, a much simpler scheme was used where the same hues were shown in large irregular areas, again demarcated in black. In the first combat actions, it became clear that German machine gunners concentrated their fire on the vision slits. To confuse them, in the summer of 1917 a cross-hatched scheme of narrow vertical and horizontal dark grey stripes was applied on top of the original patches. The stripes continued over the side machine gun ball mounts but a round area remained untouched to suggest a false position. The individual Schneider CA tanks had serial numbers ranging from 61001 to 61399. The first tactical markings consisted of simple numbers, to distinguish the individual tanks within a training unit. In early 1917 the combat units used small inconspicuous playing-card symbols, each symbol indicating one of four batteries within a groupe. These were sprayed in white on the tank side, often combined with an individual tank number, depending on the style each groupe preferred. The tank number could also be indicated on the tank spur, by horizontal stripes.

== Production ==
In the original contract of 25 February 1916 it had been stipulated that all four hundred units would be delivered that same year: the first hundred by 25 August and the last by 25 November, completing the full order in nine months. Because Schneider had no experience in tracked armoured fighting vehicle production and a true pilot model was lacking, this was highly optimistic. The Schneider company had expected to be able to employ the other major French arms producer, the Forges et Aciéries de la Marine et d'Homécourt (FAMH), as a subcontractor but they had developed a heavier tank design of their own, the Saint-Chamond tank. As a result, the first prototype could only be presented to the Ministry of Armament on 4 August. The Schneider subsidiary Société d'outillage mécanique et d'usinage d'artillerie (SOMUA) at Saint Ouen near Paris was only able to finish the first vehicle chassis on 5 September, which was delivered at the training centre at Marly on 8 September with the first Army tests carried out on 12 September. By the original deadline of 25 November just eight vehicles had been delivered; on 4 January 1917 thirty-two were present. To aggravate matters, these were training vehicles, not fitted with hardened armour but ordinary boiler plate.

Late January production picked up, reaching three or four units per day. However, it soon slowed down again because the new Commander-in-Chief, Robert Nivelle, ordered that priority should be given to the manufacture of the Schneider CD artillery towing tractor. As a result, production fell from seventy tanks between 28 January and 27 February to sixty between the latter date and 28 March and only twenty additional vehicles were manufactured up to 12 April. By 15 March the Army had accepted 150 tanks; by 1 April 208, by 1 June 322. Then production almost came to a halt, both because of a loss of interest in the type and to maintain a sufficient supply of spare parts. The total reached 340 on 30 September, 370 on 1 December and 372 on 19 December. The full order would not be completed until August 1918. The ultimate costs of the project were about fifty million French francs. Official factory deliveries were fifty in 1916, 326 in 1917 and twenty-four in 1918. Of these 397 were transferred to the French Army.

Early in 1917 one vehicle was delivered to Italy. It had been ordered by the Italians after Captain Alfredo Bennicelli had observed the first French Army testing in September 1916; the single vehicle was tested in 1917 and deployed on the Kras front. It made a favourable impression and in the autumn of 1917 the Italian High Command desired either the purchase of twenty Schneiders or the tooling capable of producing them. This plan was abandoned after the heavy defeat of the Italian Army at the Battle of Caporetto. Its High Command now envisaged a far larger number of tanks, demanding the import or manufacture of about 1,500 Schneiders. After it had become clear that the French industry did not have the spare capacity to meet those demands and that they far out-reached the possibilities of domestic production, it was decided to produce the smaller, cheaper and more modern FIAT 3000 (a copy of the Renault FT) instead, three of which had been received in May 1918.

== Improvements ==
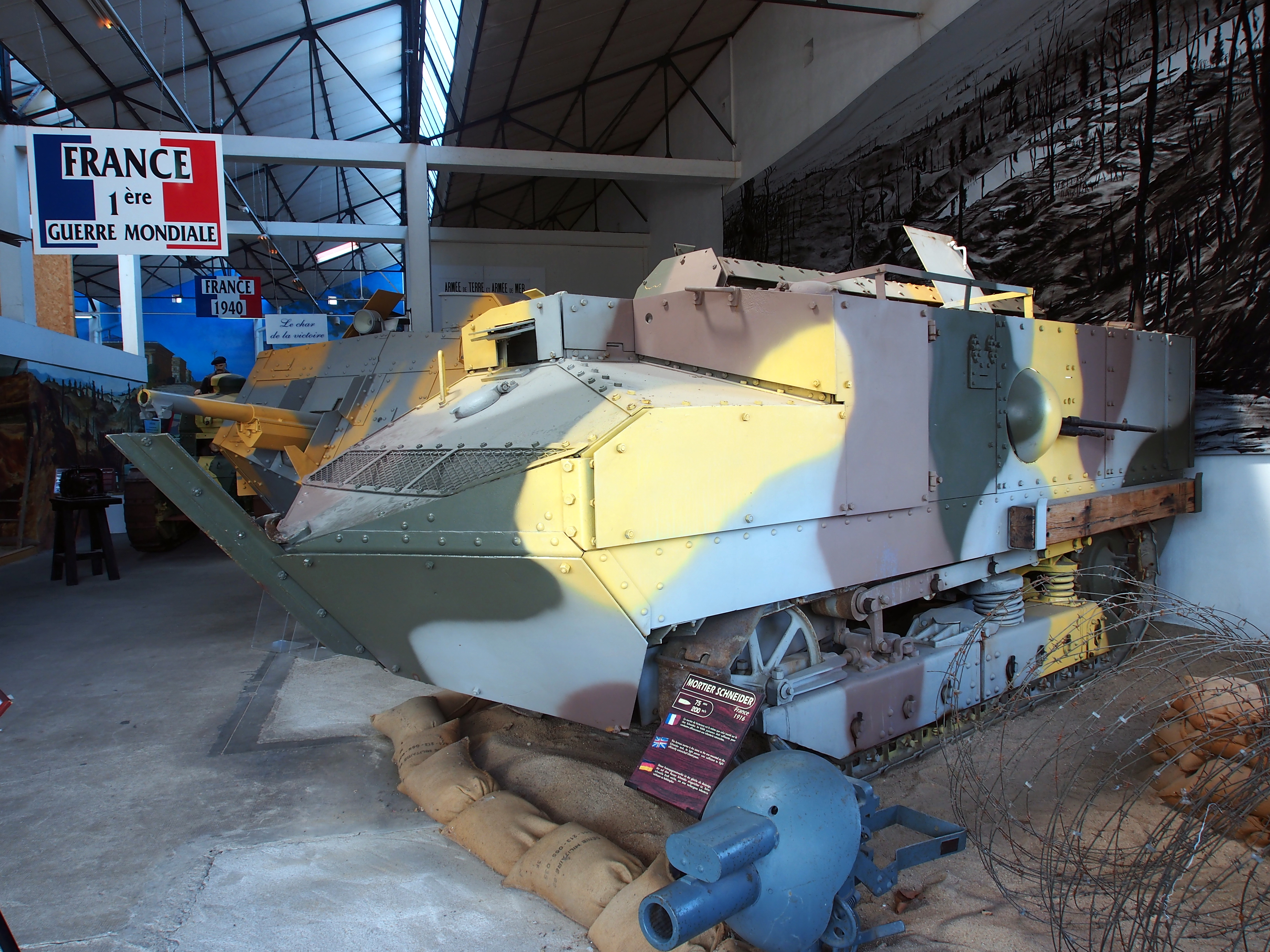
The Saumur vehicle shows all later improvements

During production, the type was gradually improved, which caused further delays. From the 245th vehicle onwards an automatic starter was installed, engaged by a handle, as the original manual system did not allow for a sufficiently quick response to a changing battlefield situation. Also it was decided the design was too poorly protected. In response to the first use of British Mark I tanks on 15 September 1916, the Germans had begun to introduce anti-tank weapons and tactics. One of the measures taken by them was the issuing of the Kerngeschoss or "K-bullet", a hardened steel core round capable of piercing the thin armour of tanks. To defeat it, from the 210th vehicle onwards the Schneider tank was fitted with extra 5.4 mm thick armour plates on the sides and front with a space of four centimetres between the main armour and these appliqué plates. Even without the spaced armour, the front plates would have been immune against K-bullet fire from a distance of two hundred metres, because they were angled at 60°, providing an effective line-of-sight thickness of 22.8 mm (0.90 in). During the spring of 1917 existing vehicles were up-armoured (creating a surblindé version) by the army workshop at Champlieu. Some of these, such as a vehicle with series number 61213, were fitted with additional armour plates on the vertical front surfaces, including an extra rectangular shield around the gun barrel. On 1 April 1917 of the 208 tanks available only about a hundred had been retrofitted. None of the older tanks had at this point yet received the new starter engine, this part of the improvement process would take until the end of the summer.

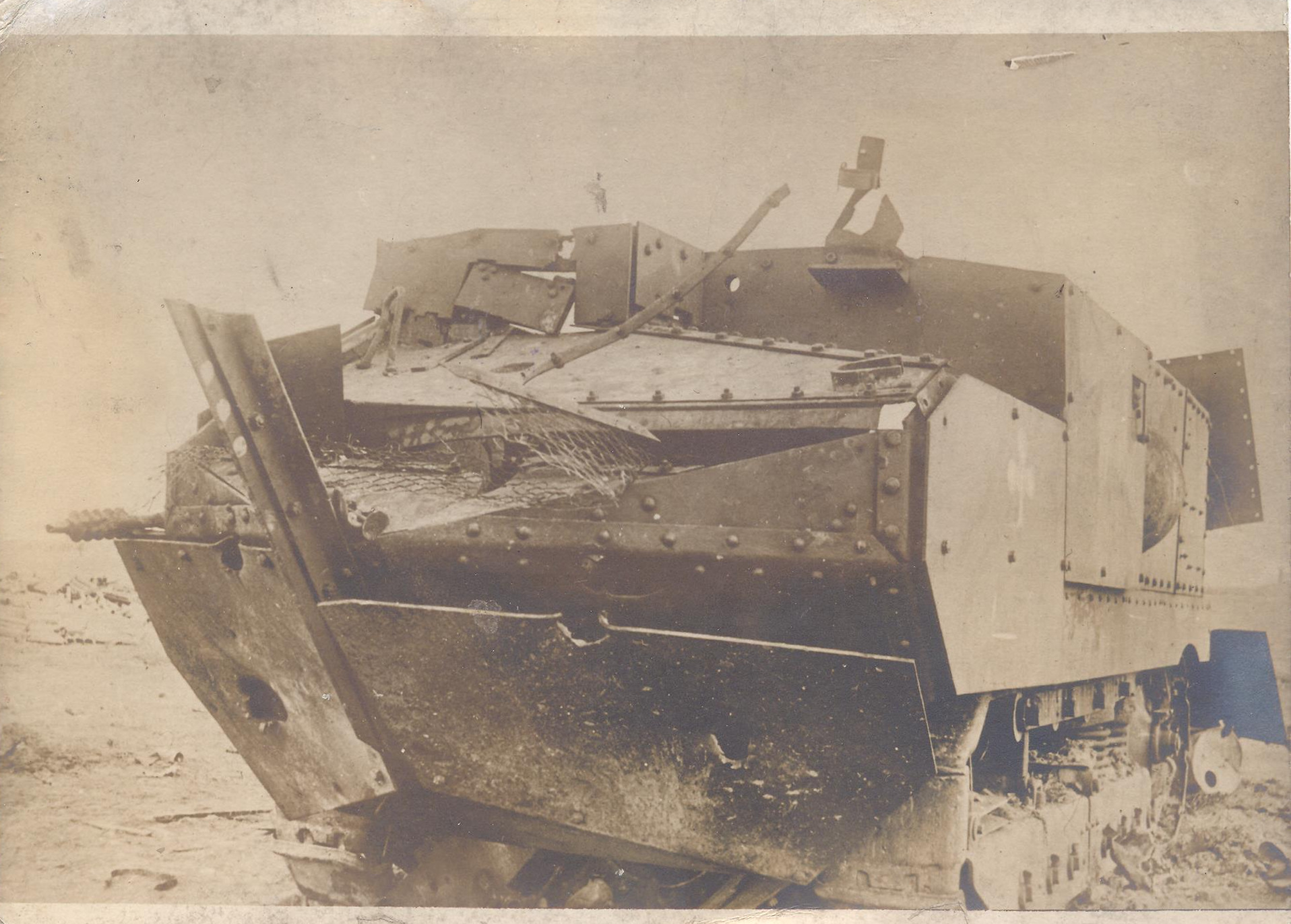
Damage to the outer armour plates of this Schneider shows the armour of the hull behind

The first combat actions showed that the fuel reservoirs were prone to explode when the vehicle was hit by an artillery round. To remedy this the reservoirs were replaced by fuel tanks with a double wall, using a felt filler layer to absorb gasoline leakages. Furthermore, these fuel tanks, each containing 80 L (21 US gal), were moved to a safer position under armour though still outside the hull, in vertical rectangular steel boxes to the left and right of the rear door. This necessitated the construction of an additional safer exit, at the left side of the vehicle. On 8 September 1917 only twelve tanks had been changed to this new configuration. As of 21 March 1918 about 245 vehicles featured all three of these major improvements.

Numerous smaller modifications were introduced during the testing phase and the production run. The first included an improved cooling system and better ventilation to prevent and remove carbon monoxide fumes which otherwise threatened to asphyxiate the crew within an hour. To prevent dirt entering the chassis near the crank, at the bottom of the vehicle an armour plate was added. Later additions were a periscope sight, an exhaust pipe, and speaking tubes for internal communications. In 1917, to provide some modicum of communication with higher command levels and accompanying tanks or infantry, a hinged metal shield was attached to the rear of the hull skylight roof. Its back was painted in a conspicuous horizontal tricolour red-white-red scheme. When lifted by means of a steel cable operable from the inside via a grooved small vertical plate located on the front of the skylight roof, it indicated the position of the tank to friendly observers from behind. Several versions of this system existed, differing in the precise location of the shield and its shape. It was especially intended to signal to the infantry that it was safe to advance after the tank had neutralised all enemy machine-gun positions.

Some improvements were studied but not applied. Simple ones included the introduction of track shoes with a chevron profile to improve grip. Also it was originally considered to use blocks of sodium peroxide ("oxylithe") to remove the carbon monoxide, but this was rejected in view of the fire hazard. The first testing to equip a French tank with a radio set was carried out in the summer of 1917 with a Schneider CA, using a twelve-metre wire antenna with a range of 8.5 km (5.3 mi). A second test with a fourteen-metre antenna on 18 August 1917 established that contact could be made with an aircraft within a distance of two kilometres provided that the tank was not moving, and it was decided to equip the command tanks of two units, AS 11 and AS 12, with an Émitteur 10ter radio set.

Much more far-reaching were early proposals to fundamentally change the design, to be implemented during the production run. These were inspired by the awkward layout; in order to limit the width of the tank, the main armament had been placed in an inconvenient position. On 1 December 1916 a certain Lieutenant Saar submitted drawings showing a vehicle on which the 75 mm cannon had been replaced by a 47 mm gun turret, the number of machine guns was raised to six, the number of vision slits to eleven and the engine was located in the middle of the hull. On 28 and 29 December 1916 the Schneider company considered moving the 75 mm gun to the nose of the vehicle and give it a 120° traverse.

== Operational history ==
=== Training ===
To deploy tanks, it was first needed to train crews and create tank units. On 14 July 1916 Estienne started to set up a training base at the Fort du Trou-d'Enfer, a fortress at Marly-le-Roi, west of Paris. For reasons of secrecy this location was officially attached to the 81st Heavy Artillery Regiment, a depot unit. On 15 August the camp was formally established and quickly filled with recruits, most of them young volunteers from various French armies. At Marly the crews received their first instruction consisting of the basics of maintenance and a lot of driver training with an emphasis on crossing trenches, avoiding shell craters and running down trees and walls. Because no actual Schneider vehicles were available at first, Holt tractors were used instead; later boiler plate training chassis were employed with the superstructure removed and replaced by a protective wooden frame. From the spring of 1917 onwards about seven vehicles were used for this goal. For unit training and live fire exercises, which required much larger manoeuvre grounds, on 30 August 1916 a camp was established at Cercottes. It received its first training vehicles on 17 November 1916. To get better acquainted with the mechanical side of the tanks, most crew members left Cercottes for a month to work as a trainee at the SOMUA factory. New vehicles would normally be first delivered at Cercottes. In 1917 the Cercottes base grew to a strength of about five thousand men, many of them sent there from units trying to get rid of undesirable elements, forcing the base command to reduce manpower by again removing them. On 28 September 1916 a large instruction centre was established at Champlieu, south of Compiègne. This location, close to the frontline and officially part of the warzone, could serve for final training and sending out battle-ready units to those armies needing them. The tank workshops were also located there, repairing and updating existing vehicles. The bases at Cercottes and Champlieu used about sixty-four tanks purely for training purposes, to limit the wear on the combat vehicles.

=== Unit formation ===
The French Army did not intend to create an independent tank force; the tank units would be part of the Artillery Arm, which was reflected in the organisational terminology. The basic units were officially called Groupes, but had the designation "AS", for Artillerie Spéciale. Each group consisted of four batteries, each battery again of four tanks. This would have resulted in a total of sixteen tanks and indeed this was the official organic strength of an AS, but the fourth battery was normally a depot unit, intended to provide replacement vehicles and crews for the other three batteries. It had an official allotment of three tanks and the total matériel strength of an AS was thus fifteen. Actual operational strength varied wildly, due to frequent breakdowns. The personnel strength consisted of twelve officers — each commanding a tank of the three regular batteries — sixteen NCOs and 110 men of lower rank. In practice often four batteries of three tanks were fielded, to allow for a greater tactical flexibility. The first Schneider CA units were formed from 17 November 1916 onwards. Six AS were raised until the end of January 1917, three more in February and March each and again two in April and May each for a total of seventeen operational Groupes, numbered AS 1–17. Three more had been created by 2 June 1917, AS 18, 19 and 20, but were almost immediately dissolved, their personnel retrained to form Saint Chamond units. Between 1 March and 1 May 1917 the AS were combined into five larger units, called Groupements, with a variable strength. In May 1918, three of the surviving four Groupements, I, II and IV, were each attached to three light tank Renault FT battalions to form larger Régiments de Artillerie Spéciale, the 501e, 502e and 504e RAS respectively.

=== Actions ===
==== Berry-au-Bac ====
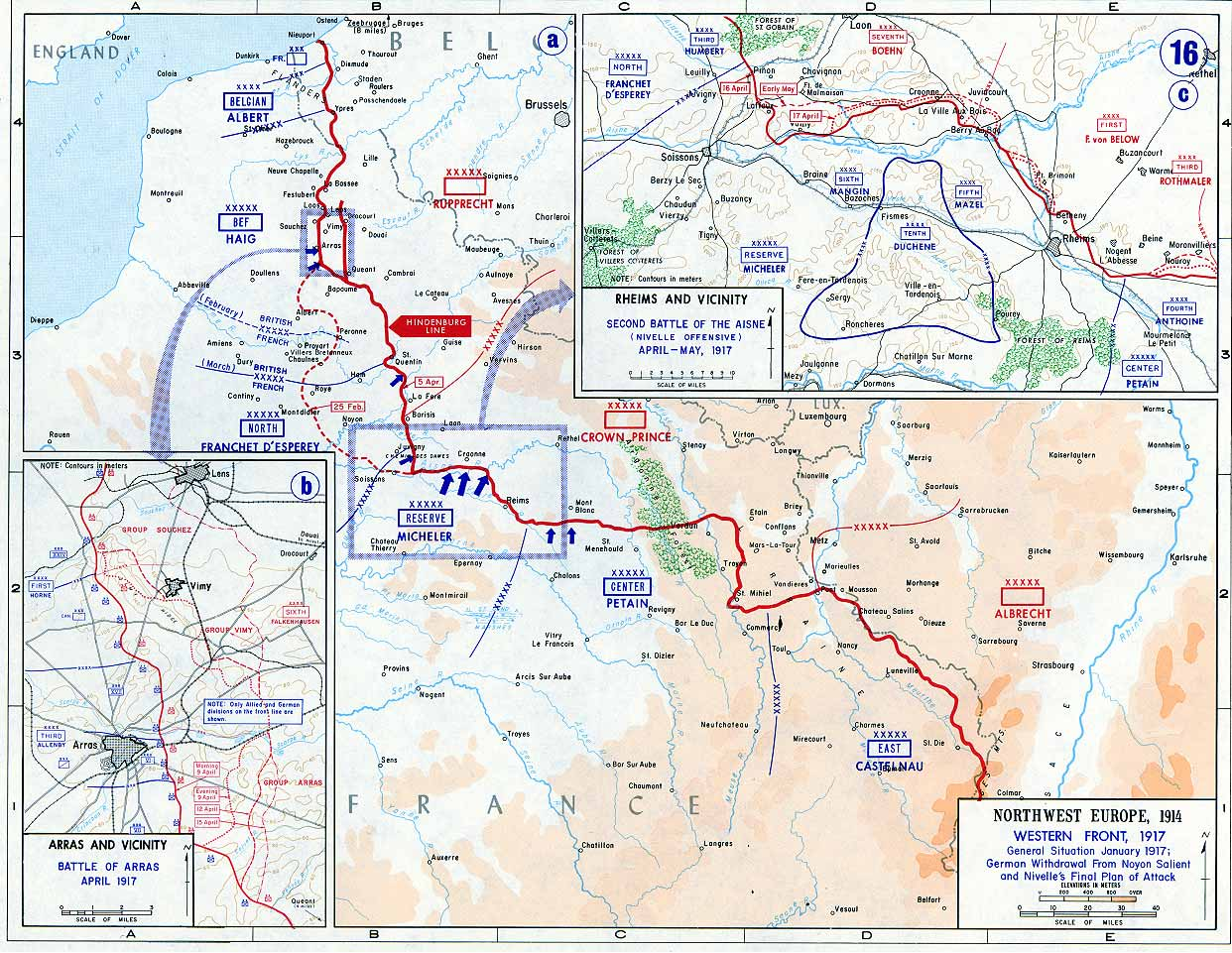
The Western Front in 1917 with the blue arrows indicating the sectors of the Nivelle Offensive

Estienne had hoped to create a powerful and large striking force before committing his tanks to battle. He had strongly disapproved of the, in his eyes premature, British use of tanks in September 1916, just two months after first deliveries of the Mark I. However, political circumstances would compel him to deploy the Artillerie Spéciale before it was at full strength or adequately trained. In December 1916 Robert Nivelle had been appointed supreme French commander on the promise that his tactical innovation of the "rolling barrage" would ensure a quick collapse of the German front. Not favourably inclined towards the independent mass deployment of armour, Nivelle hoped that the tanks produced could be made of some use by letting them assist his planned offensive. Ultimately, the Germans learned of the French intentions so that strategic surprise was lost, allowing them to reinforce the threatened front sectors; nor was there a tactical surprise, as it had become known that French tanks existed and were about to be introduced. Three AS first assembled at the frontline near Beuvraignes in late March 1917, hoping to exploit a possible success in an offensive by the Third Army, that however had to be cancelled because of the strategic German retreat to the Hindenburg Line. Eventually, the tank units were to support the attack by the Fifth Army at the Aisne and were concentrated in a nine kilometres wide sector south of Juvincourt-et-Damary, chosen for its firm ground. The Germans had created a strong defensive belt in this area, held by four divisions of the Bavarian Army, with a depth of nine kilometres and divided into four main trench systems. The plan was for the French infantry to take the first and second trench within about four hours, advancing behind the "creeping barrage", after which the tanks would immediately exploit this success and maintain the momentum of the offensive by quickly progressing towards the third trench, directly followed by the infantry; together they would conquer the third and fourth trenches. The "strategic rupture" resulting from this and many adjoining attacks was to be exploited through deep penetrations by large reserve infantry armies, outflanking the Hindenburg Line from the south.

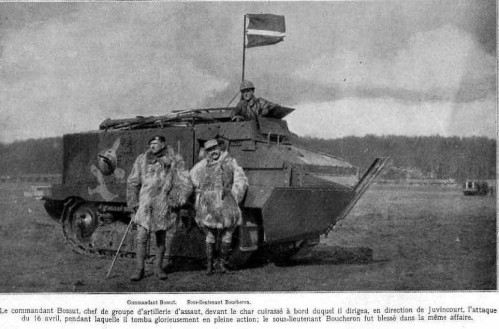
Bossut in front of an up-armoured vehicle, prior to the offensive

Three Groupements were committed to the offensive. Two of these, named after their commanders Louis Bossut and Louis Léonard Chaubès, were attached to the 32nd and 5th Army Corps respectively and would engage on the first day. Groupement Bossut consisted of five groupes: AS 2, 4, 5, 6 and 9, thus fielding eighty tanks, as the AS in this phase of the war operated at full strength with four batteries of four tanks. Groupement Chaubès, created on 8 March, included AS 3, 7 and 8, with about forty-eight tanks. Each Groupement was reinforced by a supply and recovery unit or Section de Réparations et de Ravitaillement which besides two unarmed Saint-Chamonds and some Baby Holt tractors was equipped with two unarmed Schneider CA tanks, towing Troy trailers with fuel, bringing the total at 132 Schneider vehicles, at that date the largest tank force ever deployed. On 13 April the tank units concentrated behind the frontline. There they were joined by supporting infantry companies: five from the 154e R.I. of the 165e D.I. for Groupement Bossut and three of the 76e R.I. of the 125e D.I. for Groupement Chaubès.

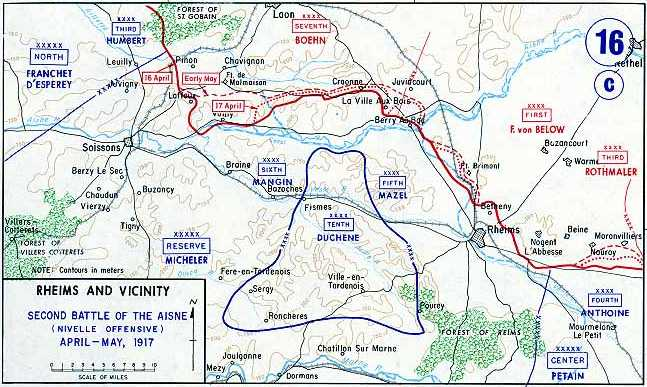
The larger front-sector of the attack of 16 April. In fact the tanks penetrated further than indicated here, to a position to the northeast of Juvincourt

During the early morning of 16 April 1917 the Nivelle Offensive was launched. In the sector where the tanks operated the initial waves of French infantry succeeded in taking the first and second German trenches as planned, but with very heavy losses. The French artillery was insufficient in number to simultaneously sustain the creeping barrage and suppress the numerous German artillery batteries. This was aggravated by the German air superiority which allowed artillery observation planes to precisely direct German interdiction fire on the advancing French columns. Groupement Chaubès suffered many losses before it was even able to leave the French lines. When arriving at the frontline in the early afternoon, it had to assist the infantry in clearing the second trench of the last German remnants. These did not panic at the sight of the French tanks but had been trained to hide from them, leaving their cover to engage the French infantry when the armoured vehicles had moved on. At the end of the day, the French infantry proved unable to continue the offensive and the last surviving French tanks had to be withdrawn. More to the east, north of Berry-au-Bac after which village later the entire tank action would be named, Groupement Bossut proved more successful. It managed to cross the various trench lines losing only a few vehicles and in the late morning concentrated to carry on the offensive. However, around 11:00 the tank of Bossut, Trompe-la-Mort ("Dare-devil") leading the advance, carrying a tricolour fanion blessed in the Sacré-Cœur at Montmartre, received a direct heavy artillery hit, incinerating most of the crew and blowing Bossut himself from the rear entrance from which he had been directing the battle, killed by a shell splinter through the heart. Nevertheless, the Schneiders continued their progress, advancing several miles in a narrow penetration through a shallow valley towards the third German trench. The weakened infantry though, was unable to follow, forcing the tanks to wait for the arrival of reserve units. For several hours the tanks moved up and down the conquered terrain to avoid presenting static targets for the German artillery. Despite this many vehicles were hit, as they were in plain sight of German batteries on the surrounding hills. Flank assaults by Bavarian stormtroopers were repulsed. In the early evening, fresh infantry units together with the tanks conquered a sector of the third trench, marking the high tide of the French progress during the entire Second Battle of the Aisne. The Schneiders then withdrew, again suffering losses by artillery fire.

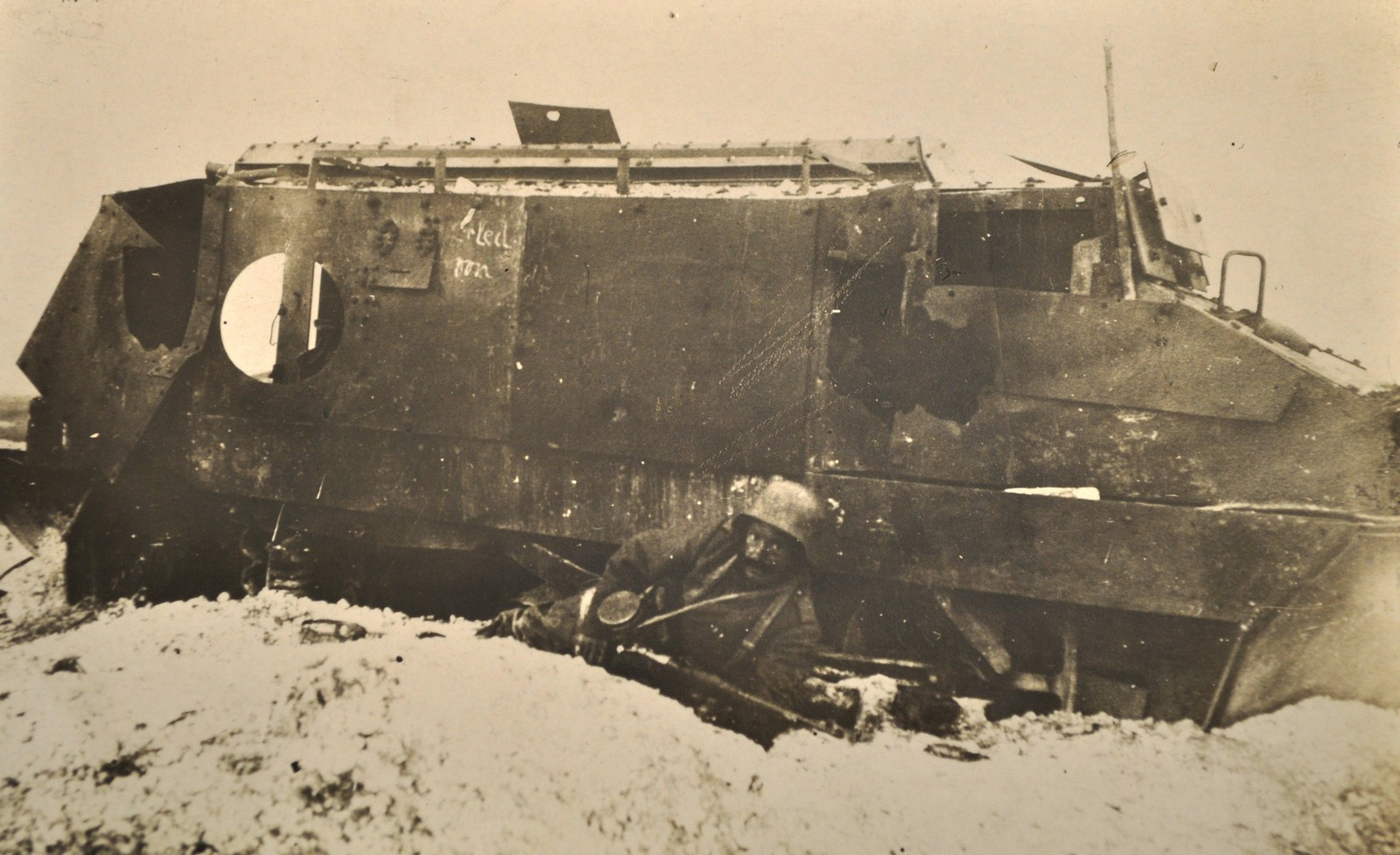
One of the tanks destroyed at Berry-au-Bac

The Nivelle Offensive was a grave disappointment, demoralising the French troops and leading to the French Army mutinies. The sense of failure extended to the Schneider tanks. Their losses had indeed been heavy: 76 of the 128 combat tanks engaged had been lost. Many of these had burnt: 57 in total, 31 with Groupement Bossut and 26 with Groupement Chaubès. Most had been set on fire by German artillery: twenty-three vehicles of Groupement Chaubès had been hit by indirect fire and fifteen of Groupement Bossut; this latter unit had fourteen tanks hit by direct fire. Investigations showed that most vehicles had carried additional fire-hazards: to compensate the limited range two fifty litre cans of petrol had been attached to the rear and some crews had even stowed a third one inside; sometimes explosive charges had been stowed outside; each tank had a bottle of ether to mix with the petrol to boost the engine and to enhance the fighting spirit three litres of strong liquor had been provided at the start of the battle. Also the personnel losses had been high: 180 of the 720 crew members, and 40% of the supporting infantry had become casualties. On a positive note, twenty broken-down tanks had been salvaged from the battlefield, all enemy infantry assaults had failed, and the spaced armour proved to be very resistant, beyond expectations, against small-arms fire and shell splinters. The main technical complaint was that visibility from within the vehicle was poor for the driver as well as the gunners. Tactical lessons drawn were that tanks should spread out more to avoid artillery fire and had to cooperate more closely with the infantry.

Groupement III, commanded by Captain Henri Lefebvre, was intended to assist an attack by the Fourth Army on 17 April at Moronvilliers. It consisted of two Schneider groups, AS 1 and AS 10, reinforced by some Saint-Chamond tanks. When the initial infantry attacks largely failed, the tank attack was cancelled, also in view of the events the previous day.

==== Moulin-de-Laffaux ====
Despite the general failure of the Nivelle Offensive and the ensuing mutinies, French High Command in May 1917 tried to make use of the force concentration at the Aisne by at least conquering the notorious Chemin-des-Dames positions. Part of the plan was a limited but strategically important objective: the German salient east of Laffaux where the Hindenburg Line hinged on the Chemin-des-Dames, named after the hillock of the Moulin-de-Laffaux. This attack was to be supported by Groupement Lefebvre. To improve the cooperation with the infantry, the Groupement was reinforced by an infantry battalion specially trained in combined arms tactics, the 17e Bataillon de Chasseurs à Pied. Coordination with the artillery was improved by attaching a special observation plane, protected by six SPAD VII fighters, that had to identify German antitank-batteries and have them destroyed by counter-battery fire; it also had to report the position of the tanks to higher command levels.

The more general offensive was launched on 5 May. Whereas most infantry attacks along the Chemin-des-Dames were bloody failures that day, the tank attack on the Moulin-de-Laffaux largely attained its objectives. The Schneiders, advancing not in column but "line abreast", exploited the initial infantry conquest of the first trench by crossing the second and then assisted the foot soldiers in heavy and fluid battles with counterattacking German reserves. Eventually most tanks broke down and had to be left behind by the advancing infantry. Salvaging them proved difficult as thunderstorms made the surface of the in itself firm chalkstone of the area very slippery and the terrain was rough, dotted with ruins and intersected by ravines and quarries. The majority of the vehicles were repaired during the night, but the soil had so deteriorated that only a single battery of four was deployed on the sixth. Nevertheless, the Schneiders had made a good account of themselves. Of thirty-three tanks engaged only five had been destroyed, three of them Schneiders. Casualties among the crews numbered fifty-five, three of them fatal.

==== La Malmaison ====
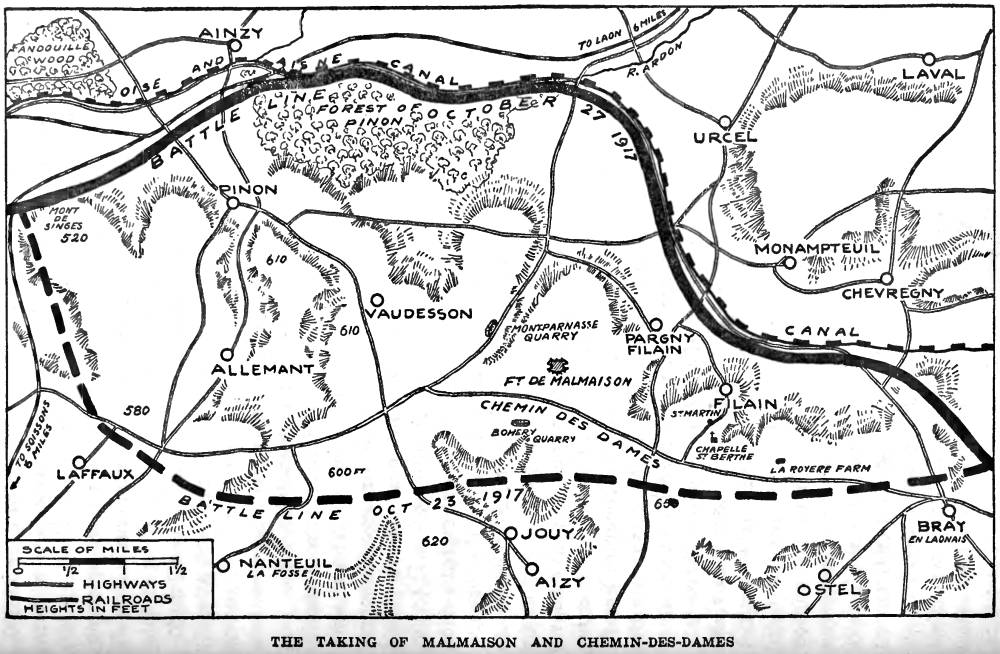
The battle of La Malmaison

In the wake of the mutinies Philippe Pétain was appointed supreme commander. He tried to restore confidence by abstaining from overambitious offensive plans. Only in 1918 when the influx of American troops and new armoured vehicles would tip the balance in favour of the Entente, could decisive attacks be considered. His motto was therefore: J'attends les Américains et les chars ("I wait for the Americans and the tanks"). However, remaining purely inactive would undermine the morale; to bolster it a series of meticulously prepared small-scale offensives were undertaken in which success was guaranteed by deploying an overwhelming numerical superiority, especially in artillery, to conquer a limited objective. On 23 October 1917 Pétain in one blow took the notorious Chemin-des-Dames crest, including the fortress of La Malmaison. The attack was supported by Groupement Chaubès, at the time consisting of AS 8, 11 and 12. Due to the losses in April, each AS now deployed twelve tanks. Including the supply vehicles the Schneider total numbered forty-one. The command vehicles of AS 11 and AS 12 were that day the first French tanks ever to use radio equipment in battle.

The tanks did not play a decisive role in this action. Because of the traffic jam, many were unable to even leave their own lines; many others broke down or got stuck in a marsh before reaching the enemy. Those that managed to engage however, effectively cooperated with the infantry. A ground fog largely hid the vehicles from enemy artillery and the spaced armour defeated German machine-gun Kerngeschoss-rounds. Losses were therefore low, with two tanks burnt and less than 10% personnel casualties. Six vehicles that had in May been abandoned at Moulin-de-Laffaux, could now be salvaged. Despite their modest contribution, the efficacy of the tanks seemed proven, justifying the planned expansion of the tank force. During the three 1917 battles, Schneider tanks engaged 175 enemy targets. Eighty-six vehicles were lost that year.

==== The 1918 battles ====
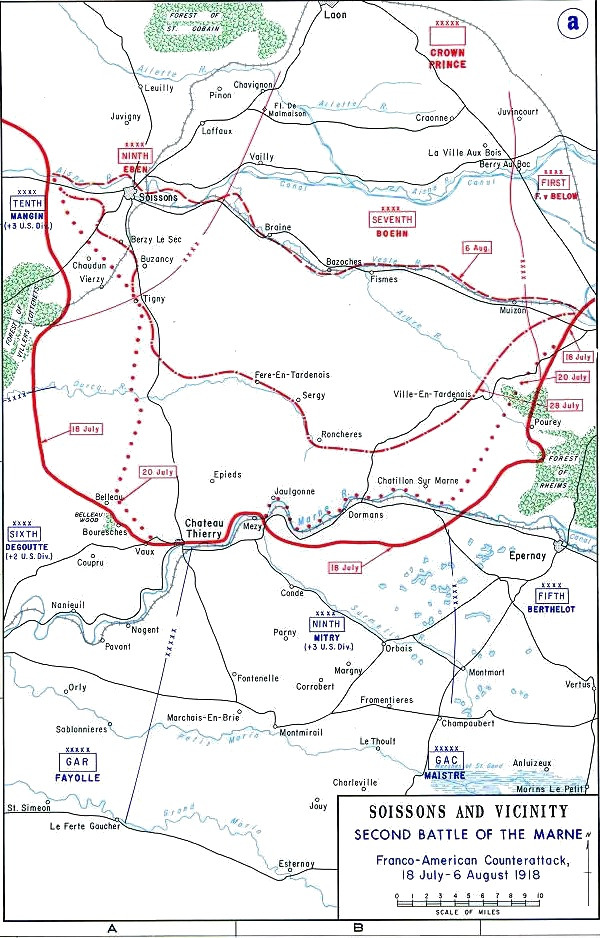
The Battle of Soissons, the most successful Schneider action

French command considered to launch large-scale summer offensives in 1918, benefiting from a grown number of AFVs. At this point of the war, less than a year after their first employment, the Schneider tanks were already considered obsolete. They nevertheless still formed an essential part of the tank force: a successor medium tank type, the Schneider Modèle 1917, had been cancelled; the light Renault FT had not been produced in sufficient numbers yet, especially the 75 mm cannon version; and the Saint-Chamond was of limited utility, so the Schneiders had to provide the necessary fire-power. Their continued importance became obvious when the French plans were on 21 March, at which date 245 Schneider tanks were operational, disrupted by the German spring offensive, a massive infantry onslaught made possible by the Treaty of Brest-Litovsk allowing Germany to shift the bulk of its forces to the Western Front. In April there were minor counterattacks at the Somme by a small number of Schneider tanks: five vehicles on the 5th at Sauvillers-Mongival, six on the 7th at Grivesnes, and twelve on the 18th at the Bois de Sénécat, west of Castel. On 28 May, also at the Somme, twelve vehicles (AS 5) supported an American Expeditionary Forces attack in the Battle of Cantigny, the first time in history American troops cooperated with tanks. At first the German offensive was largely directed against the British Expeditionary Force but when this ultimately failed to produce the desired decisive breakthrough, late May the Germans turned in force on the French in the Third Battle of the Aisne. The German advance threatened the Champlieu base, which was abandoned, severely disrupting repair and maintenance. Early June the offensives had created a large French salient around Compiègne and Erich Ludendorff decided to reduce it in Operation Gneisenau. Soon for the French the situation became critical as a German success would open the way to Paris. On 11 June, tanks were for the first time used in mass for a mobile counterattack in the Battle of Matz. Although most of the vehicles involved were of the Saint-Chamond type, two Schneider Groupements (II and III) also participated with seventy-five tanks. The French armour concentration, hitting the flank of the enemy penetration, succeeded in halting the German advance and Gneisenau was cancelled. The success came at a price however: thirty-five Schneiders were lost. In the west of the salient on 9 July a small local counterattack took place named after the Porte and Des Loges farms, which was supported by about fifteen Schneider tanks of AS 16 and AS 17.

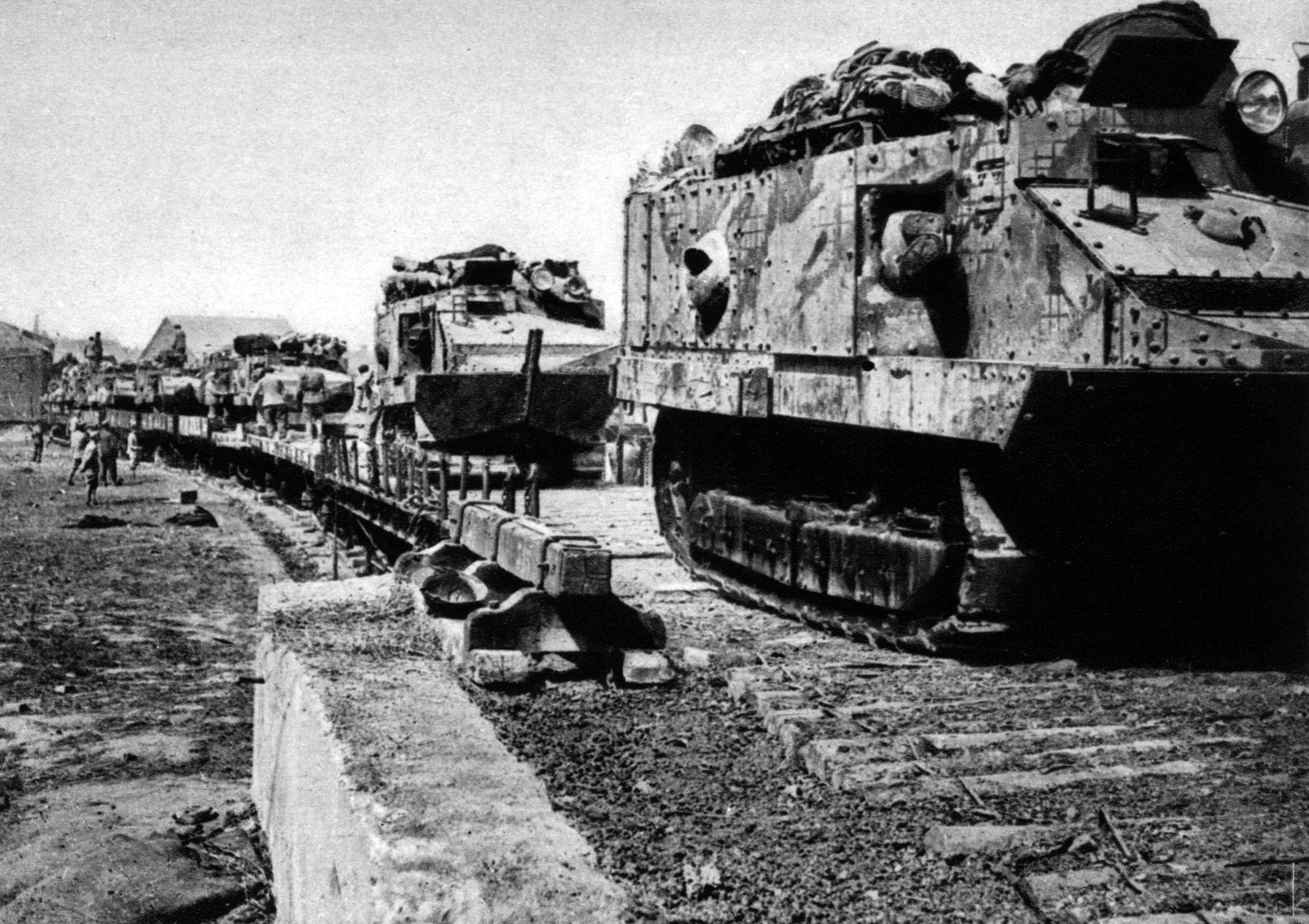
Schneider tanks, here with the later cross-hatched camouflage, were mostly transported by rail

On 15 July the Germans began their last large 1918 offensive, attacking Rheims in the Second Battle of the Marne. Soon their advance faltered and they found themselves in a very vulnerable situation, with overextended supply lines and exhausted troops lacking well-entrenched positions. On 18 July French and American divisions, cooperating with a large number of tanks, started a major offensive, the Battle of Soissons, in which for the first time since 1914 Entente forces on the Western Front succeeded in making substantial progress, reducing the entire German salient created in the Third Battle of the Aisne. In the operation three Schneider Groupements (I, III and IV) participated with 123 vehicles, the second largest deployment of the type during the war. The battle was a strategic disaster for the Germans, leading to the disintegration of a large part of their forces and initiating a period of almost continuous retreats. Although now at last the conditions were favourable to fulfil the offensive role for which they had been created, the Schneider tanks could not be of much assistance to the itself also decimated French infantry. By 1 August 1918 the number of operational Schneider CA tanks had dropped to fifty. As production was halted that month, losses could not be replaced, whereas the intensified fighting resulted in a much-increased wear. As a consequence, effective levels remained low: forty vehicles on 1 September, sixty on 1 October, fifty-one on 1 November. Accordingly, in subsequent operations the Schneiders never again equalled the numbers reached in July. On 16 August three groups with thirty-two tanks attacked near Tilloloy; on 20 August one group of twelve participated in actions near Nampcel. On 12 September Groupement IV could muster twenty-four tanks to support the Americans in the Battle of Saint-Mihiel. From 26 September during the Meuse-Argonne Offensive Groupement IV continued to support the Americans with about twenty-two tanks, and Groupements I and III supported the French Fourth Army with thirty-four vehicles. During October most Schneider units were recuperating and German intelligence assumed the type had now been completely phased out, replaced by the newer and more effective Renault FT tanks, but in fact it was planned to again deploy about fifty Schneiders in a large offensive in Lorraine to begin on 11 November. That day however, the First World War ended as the Armistice with Germany was concluded. During the 1918 battles, Schneider tanks engaged 473 enemy targets. In the war, in total 121 Schneider tanks had been lost, 86 in 1917 and 35 in 1918: 114 by enemy artillery fire, three by mines, three by antitank rifle fire and one by unknown causes.

== Later designs: the Schneider CA2, CA3 and CA4 ==
The first projects to create new variants were based on the original Schneider CA design. On 27 September 1916 Estienne wrote a memorandum to the General Headquarters outlining his thoughts about a possible command tank. Considering that tank units would not only attack static enemy positions but also had to manoeuvre on the battlefield against moving hostile troops, he foresaw that their commanders would need more agile vehicles with armament and armour concentrated in the front, to lead a pursuit or cover a retreat. Therefore, a variant was needed fitted with a turret featuring a 37 mm gun and one or two machine-guns in the front instead of the sides, protected by 15 mm front armour, with a crew of four and with a top speed of at least 10 km/h. Fifty such vehicles should be constructed. On 2 October, Joffre demanded the production of fifty voitures cuirassées de commandement. On 13 October Schneider had a paper design ready; on 17 October the order was confirmed by Mourret. Towards the end of 1916 a "mock-up" was ready under the designation of Schneider CA2. On 26 and 27 March 1917 a prototype made of boiler-plate, perhaps identical to the "mock-up", was tested at Marly. It had the standard suspension of the Schneider CA but its hull was significantly shortened so that the overhanging nose had disappeared. The 75 mm cannon had been replaced by a cylindrical turret, intended to be armed with a 47 mm gun and a machine-gun, close to the rear of the hull. The hull was further diminished in size and weight by a considerable narrowing, and closing of the roofed skylight slit, which lowered its height. As a result, the type weighed only eight tonnes. During the testing the vehicle, though no longer getting itself stuck on an overhanging nose, still proved unable to climb out of muddy shell craters. It was concluded that the suspension should be lengthened by the equivalence of three track links, about forty centimetres, and on 13 April 1917 a quick commencement of production was envisaged. In reality Estienne had already on 22 March decided to discontinue this project in favour of a Renault FT command (signal) version. The CA2 prototype was subsequently used as a training and test bed vehicle and the immediate need for command vehicles was met by fitting two standard Schneider CAs with radio sets. On 29 December 1916 it was proposed to develop from the Schneider CA2 two light tank prototypes.

Early 1917 it was suggested to construct some vehicles as flamethrower tanks by installing a flamethrowing device in two armoured turrets, one at the left front corner and the other at the right rear corner, each having a field of fire of about 180°. The fuel reservoirs would be inside the hull. No production resulted. In February 1917, Schneider proposed to build a variant with a thirty-two centimetres wider hull fitted in the front with a 47 mm gun and two machine-gun turrets placed diagonally behind the driver position, while the engine was relocated to the rear of the vehicle. On 2 April 1917 the Ministry of Armament asked Schneider to design two improved versions of the Schneider CA: one with a gun turret, the calibre not surpassing 47 mm if it were a long gun; the other with a long 75 mm gun in the front of the hull.

After the failure of the Nivelle Offensive, Schneider understood that more capable designs had to be manufactured if the tank were to remain a viable weapon system. On 1 May 1917 it discussed a range of possible options, numbered one to five. All had in common that basically the same mechanical components were used as with the Schneider CA, though often improved, and that the suspension was only partially changed: elongated by the addition of an eighth road wheel and using thirty-five instead of thirty-three wider, forty-five centimetres broad, track links. However, all were also significantly modernised: the hull overhang had disappeared, the hull front formed as a sloped wedge, and the inner space was compartmentalised, with an engine room, protruding behind the sprocket, at the back and the driver in front. The armour base was about sixteen to twenty millimetres. The first two proposals were probably identical to the April 1917 projects and discarded by the company as inferior. The last three, favoured by Schneider itself, were all turreted vehicles: design No 3 had a 47 mm gun in the hull and a single machine-gun turret; No 4 differed in having two machine-gun turrets and No 5 in having the gun moved to a turret. During discussions about these proposals, Estienne pointed out that the intended long 47 mm gun had not entered production yet and that no high performance explosive charge was available to give it a sufficient effect on soft targets. Therefore, he insisted on fitting the standard 75 mm field gun, even if this would raise weight to 14.5 tonnes. A week later Schneider presented proposal No 6, which envisaged a vehicle weighing fourteen tonnes and having a shortened 75 mm gun in the turret. On 5 July 1917 drawings were ready of the type, which was now called the Schneider CA3. However, these included an alternative version with a shortened 75 mm gun in the hull. Estienne had misgivings about this project, questioning its trench-crossing capacity and predicting engine power would be insufficient, given a weight that had by now reached 16.6 tonnes. Also he demanded a gun sight allowing some fire-on-the-move capability. Nevertheless, on 24 July the Consultative Committee of the Artillerie Spéciale decided that the four hundred vehicles of the Schneider Modèle 1917 ordered on 10 May 1917, were to be of the CA3 type. These had to be delivered from May 1918 onwards. A prototype was ordered of each version — the mechanical parts in May and the armour hulls in July — but the company itself limited its construction activities to the one with the gun in the hull, probably because a cannon turret was judged to be "absurd" given the lack of enemy tanks and a machine gun turret was seen as necessary for close defence against infantry assault. Later that year, in an official answer to an inquiry by parliamentarian Paul Doumer regarding the progress achieved within French tank development, the designation "Schneider CA4" is used to indicate a design studied within the context of a larger order for two prototypes, weighing twenty tonnes and fitted with a cannon turret armed with the shortened 75 mm gun, and of which Schneider is unable to predict when the single prototype to be constructed would be finished, though deliveries could start in April 1918. A mock-up was built of the Schneider CA3, and on 24 October the chassis was tested at SOMUA. During the summer however, Estienne and Pétain had become worried that the medium tank production might become an obstacle to the planned light tank mass production of the Renault FT. On 27 October the committee advised that the construction of the Schneider CA3 would be suspended in favour of light tank production. It argued that the type could probably not be delivered before August 1918 anyway, too late for the summer offensives of that year, and that an improved medium tank design should be taken into development instead. The ultimate decision not to produce the Schneider CA3 was only taken in February 1918. On 19 January 1918 it was proposed that the preproduced CA3 components would be used to construct a further two hundred Schneider artillery tractors. On 3 November 1917 the order for the Schneider CA4 prototype was annulled. The new medium tank project had already been started on 15 August 1917 and strived for a technically advanced seventeen tonne vehicle armed with a shortened 75 mm gun and benefiting from a much improved mobility. It remained a paper project.

Sometimes projects of a more general investigative nature considered to employ Schneider CA hulls. In January 1917, engineer Louis Boirault proposed an articulated tank, a vehicle that would be long enough to cross wide trenches and yet sufficiently flexible to maintain mobility. Older literature sometimes suggested that he actually coupled two Schneiders rear to rear to research this concept. In fact, this was on 8 May 1917 merely advised by the committee judging the merits of the proposal, as a lighter alternative for Boirault's original plans which envisaged three hulls of a completely new design. The Schneider company would subsequently refuse to make any vehicles available and the project was continued based on the Saint-Chamond hull.

== Aftermath ==
=== France ===
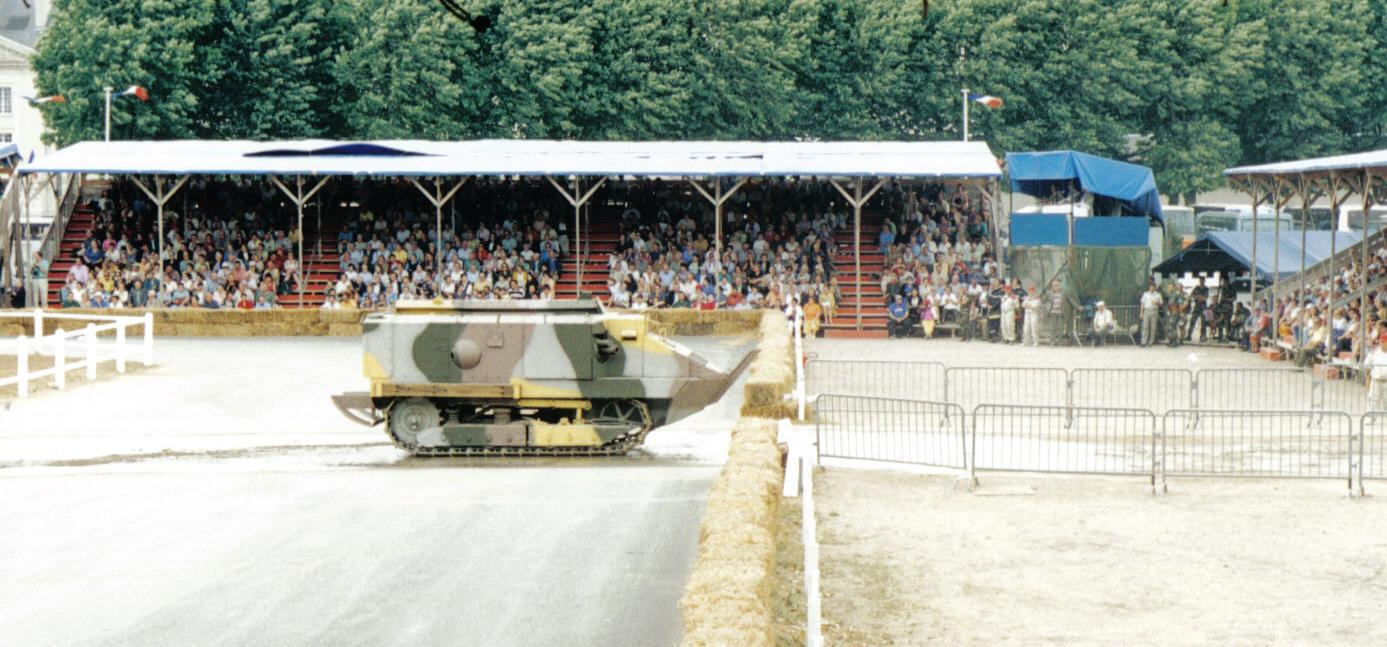
A demonstration at Saumur of the Schneider CA1, the world's oldest tank in running condition (2000)

Even before the end of the war, on 6 October 1918 Estienne had proposed to phase out all Schneider tanks from operational units, remove their armament and deploy them as instruction and recovery vehicles. These should be distinguished from those vehicles that from the very beginning had been used as supply tanks, with the cannon removed and the hole plated over. Indeed, by the end of 1918, all surviving Schneider tanks had been given the destination of utility vehicles, although it is unknown to what extent and at what rate any rebuilding took place. On 1 December 1918 Groupements I and IV fused with Renault FT units and Groupement II and III, together with AS 9 from Groupement I, reformed into three new Groupements Lourds (I, II and III) equipped with the British Mark V* type. Some of the still serviceable Schneiders were rebuilt as recovery vehicles and tank transporters serving with Renault FT units. In 1928 a project was presented for a Schneider CA Modèle 1928 recovery tank with the upper hull replaced by a motorised crane, that could be stabilised by a large jack at the rear of the vehicle.

==== Last surviving Schneider CA ====
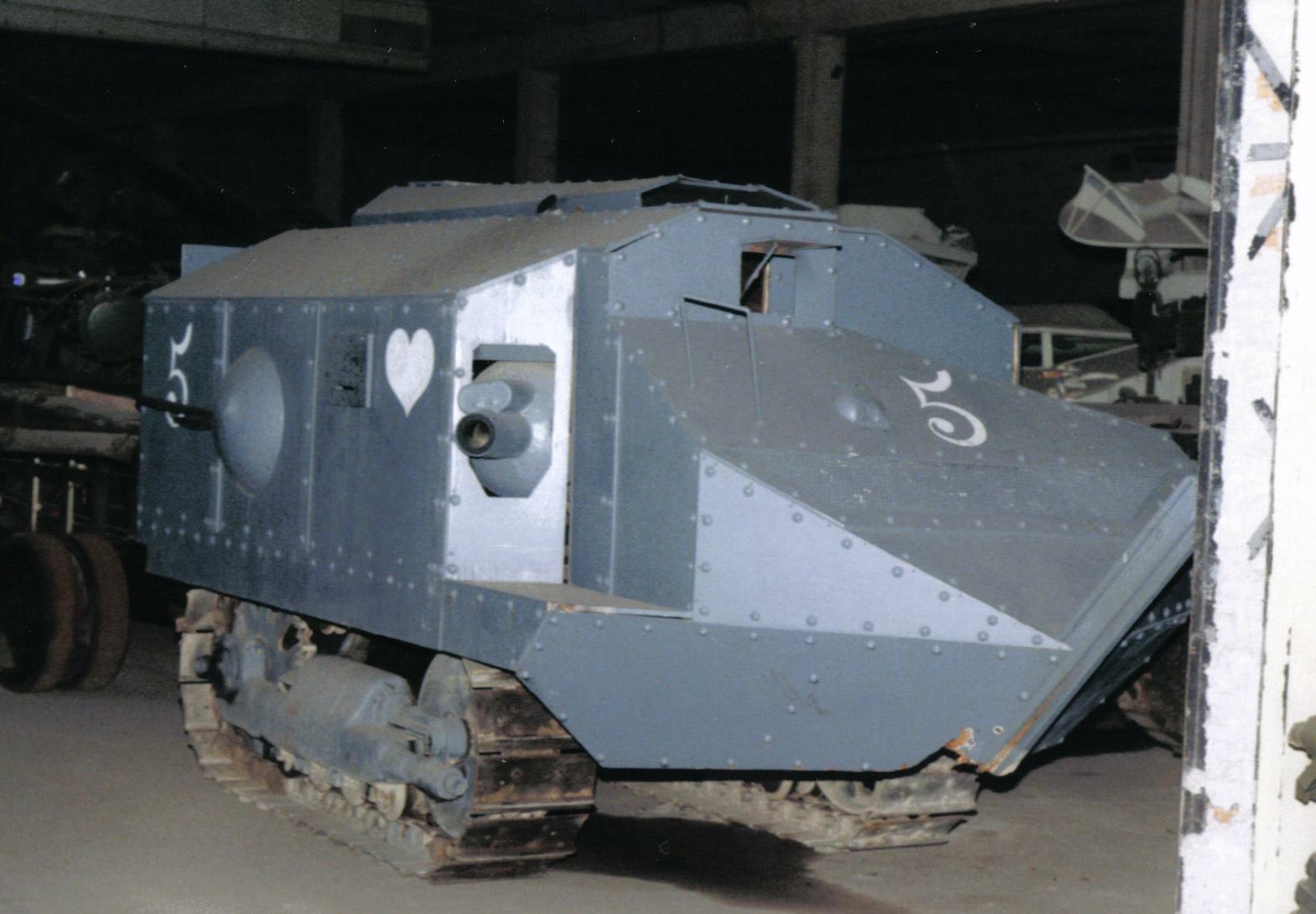
Until the last Schneider tank was restored, the Saumur museum used a wooden replica for shows.

The only surviving exemplar of the Schneider CA, at the Musée des Blindés in Saumur, is also the world's oldest tank in full running condition. It was donated at the end of the war by the French government to the United States of America, was preserved in the Aberdeen Proving Ground Ordnance Museum in Maryland, USA and in 1987 again donated to France for restoration. The tank's original four cylinder Schneider gasoline engine and the original transmissions were fully restored to original working condition by the repair teams at the Musée des Blindés. This particular vehicle had been fitted with later upgrades, such as the fuel reservoirs located at its rear.

==== Last surviving Schneider CD ====
The last surviving example of the artillery tractor variant of this vehicle is currently in the possession of the France 40 Association.

=== Italy ===
Italy in the summer of 1918 formed its first tank unit, the Reparto speciale di marcia carri d'assalto, with one Schneider and three Renault FT tanks; the Schneider tank was replaced in November 1918 with a FIAT 2000.

=== Spain ===
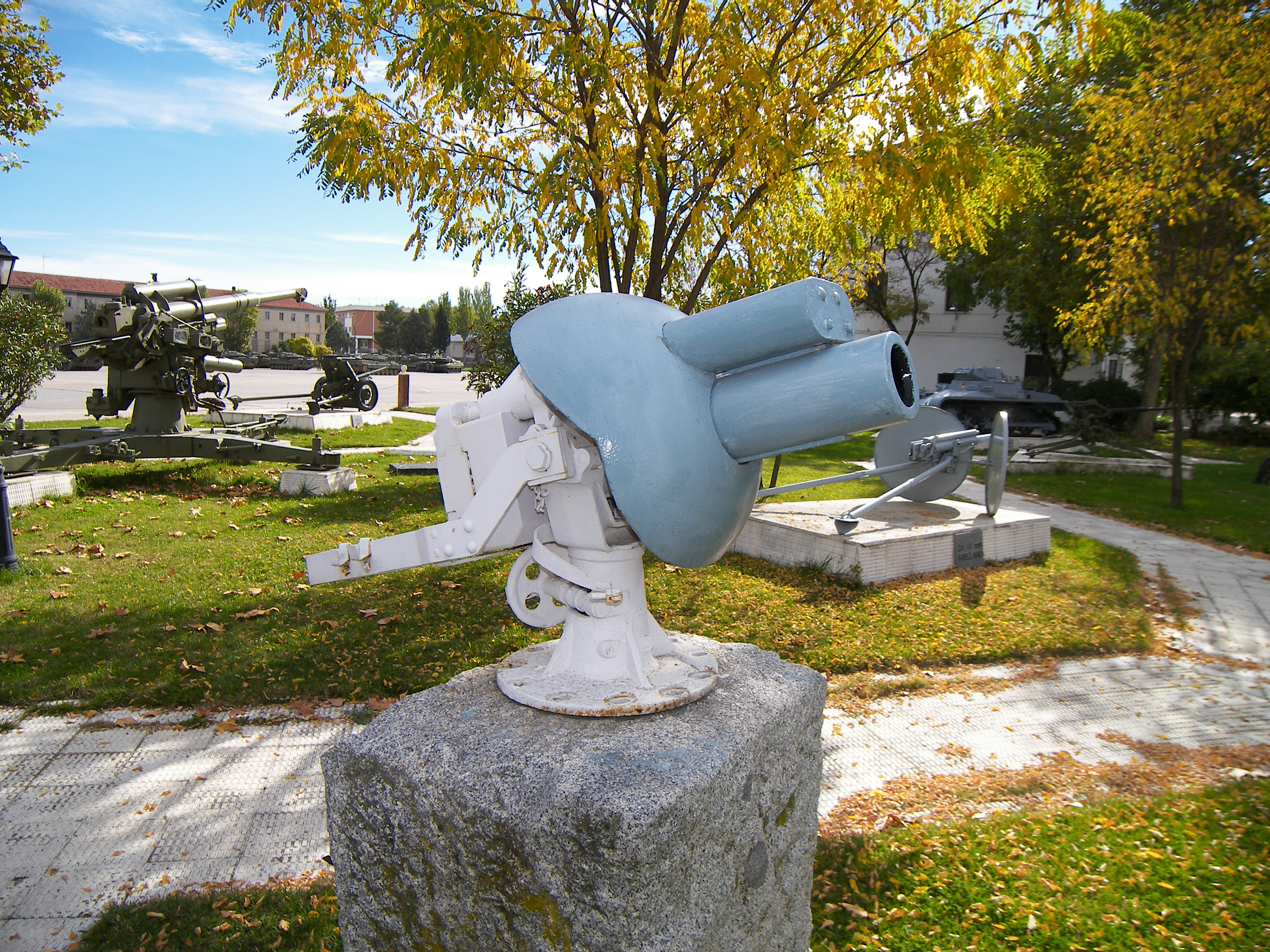
75 mm "Blockhaus Schneider" gun of the Schneider CA at the Museum of Armoured Vehicles at El Goloso, Spain

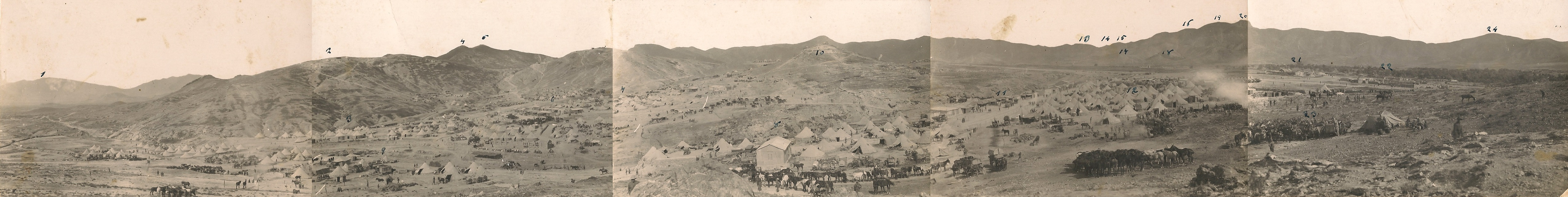
Military camp at the Moroccan town of Tafersit, where the six first tanks of the Spanish army can be seen

On one occasion after the war phased out Schneider tanks were exported. After an urgent request by the Spanish government following serious defeats against Berber rebels in the Rif War, six were sold to Spain on 16 September 1921 within the context of a joint French–Spanish effort to subdue the newly independent Rif Republic. The vehicles were designated Carro de Asalto Schneider M16 and modified by the addition of a driver's visor annex gun port in the front glacis plate. They reached Morocco on 28 February 1922. On 14 March 1922, as the first Spanish tanks to see combat action ever, they provided close support fire. Seen primarily as mobile artillery, they were combined into an artillery assault battery commanded by Captain Carlos Ruiz de Toledo which supported the single Renault FT company. In September 1925 they took part in the major amphibious landings in the bay of Al Hoceima. The Schneider tanks saw action until May 1926 and returned to Spain in 1929, not having lost a single vehicle. In Spain, due to their poor mechanical state, they were delegated to a reserve status and used as training and instruction vehicles. Four were part of the depot of the Regimiento Ligero de Carros de Combate N° 1 at Madrid, a Renault FT unit, the other two were part of the depot strength of RLCC N° 2 at Zaragoza, the other Renault FT unit. At the outbreak of the Spanish Civil War, the first unit remained under Republican command, while the second took the side of the Nationalist rebels. The Madrid vehicles saw some action during the bloody attacks on the Cuartel de la Montaña, the main military barracks of the capital. Some of the tanks were manned by militia members of the Unión General de Trabajadores and the Unión de Hermanos Proletarios. Also the Zaragoza vehicles participated in the initial fighting. Probably all Schneider tanks became inoperational during 1936.

=== China ===
According to an English military observer named Impey, the Fengtian Army had a number of Schneider tanks by 1925.

== See also ==
- History of the tank
