= Breton-Prétot machine =

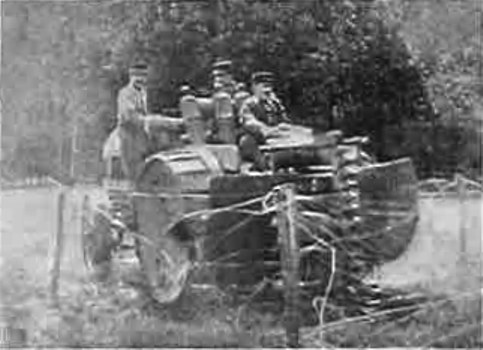
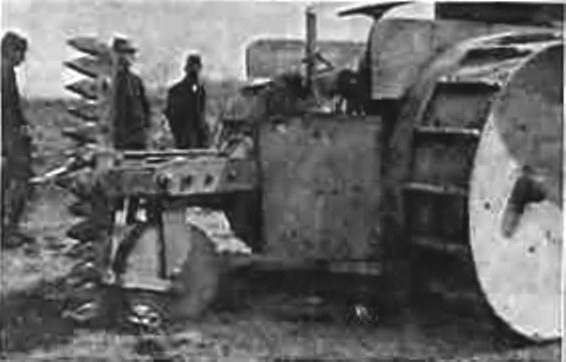
- The Breton-Prétot machine, in July 1915. The top picture shows the vertically stacked cannon; below it the original tractor version
- Type: Armoured wire cutter
- Place of origin: France

Service history
- In service: 1915 (experimental)

Specifications
- Mass: 4 tonnes (+1 tonne for armour)
- Crew: 3
- Engine: gasoline internal combustion engine

The Breton-Prétot machine was an experimental wire-cutting device developed in France from November 1914. It was developed by Mr. Prétot, engineer, and Jules-Louis Breton, member of the French National Assembly.

== Background ==
The immobility of the trench warfare characterizing the First World War led to a need for a powerfully armed military engine that would be at the same time protected from enemy fire and could move on the extremely irregular terrain of battlefields. Barbed wire especially posed a considerable threat as it was cheap and easy to install, extremely effective at slowing or stopping an offensive by troops against protected fire, and very difficult to eliminate, even with artillery. Special machines were considered to attempt to eliminate this problem: armoured, armed vehicles, with a capacity to flatten or otherwise eliminate barbed-wire lines.

== Wheel tractor base ==
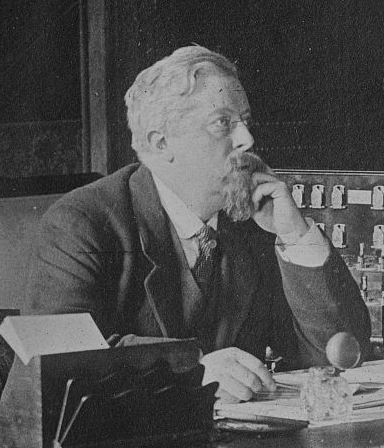
Jules-Louis Breton (1872-1940)

The Breton-Prétot machine was a saw designed to cut the barbed wire protecting enemy trenches of World War I. The first version consisted of a small circular saw, driven by a six hp engine, attached to a long lever that was placed on a small cart with four wheels, that had to be pushed towards its objective. Breton proposed the machine to the French government in November 1914 and a prototype was tried in January 1915, when it was shown that the system in this form had little practicality. The use of caterpillar tracks was discussed that same month, but since none was available at that time, the system was then mounted at Liancourt on the back of a Bajac tractor in an attempt to obtain all-terrain mobility, towards the end of February 1915. The small circular saw was replaced by a large vertical saw with thirteen teeth, but a larger horizontal circular saw was added, just above ground level to cut the barbed-wire poles. In July the system was again changed, the horizontal saw being left out and large deflection shields being placed to protect the wheels. Eight small bronze cannon were used as simulation weights.

== Caterpillar base ==
The Bajac agricultural tractor however proved not mobile enough — the initial experiment had only tested the wire-cutting ability — and had the severe disadvantage of having to approach the enemy lines driving backwards. Breton and Prétot then considered using some of the two hundred American four-wheel drive Jeffery tractors that had been commanded by the French Artillery. When this was refused, Commandant Boissin directed Breton to the Schneider company which was working on the caterpillar track system, under a production licence from the American Holt Manufacturing Company. Experiments with the Holt caterpillar tracks had started in May 1915 at the Schneider plant with a 75 hp (56 kW) wheel-directed model and the 45 hp (34 kW) integral caterpillar Baby Holt, showing the superiority of the latter. On 16 June, new experiments had followed in front of the President of the Republic. After satisfactory tests on 22 July 1915 at Maison-Lafitte, War Minister Alexandre Millerand ordered ten armoured and armed wire-cutters to be manufactured on 7 August. For his machine, Breton was thus allowed to order ten Holt tractors, to use as a base for his wire-cutting machine,. Experiments again took place on 10 September for Commander Ferrus. This order was modified on 7 December 1915 into an order to re-use the caterpillars to produce the first Schneider CA1 tanks.

=== Souain experiment ===
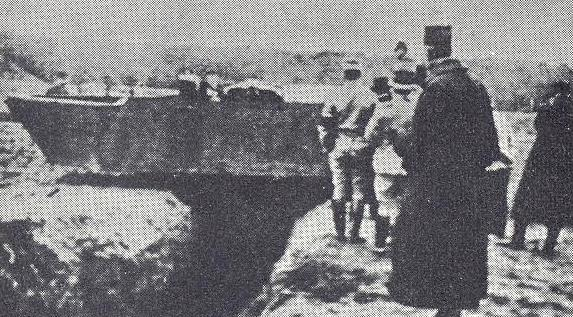
Souain prototype consisting of an armoured Baby Holt being tested at Souain on 9 December 1915

Finally, on 9 December 1915 at Souain, on a former battlefield with rough terrain and trenches, and in the presence of General Philippe Pétain, a prototype armoured vehicle motorized with a Baby Holt caterpillar was tested, with provisions to attach Breton's wire cutting apparatus to it. Only later, in early 1916, would such a device be actually attached during experiments.

These very encouraging tests prompted General Estienne to make a formal proposal on 12 December 1915 to build tanks based on a modified, lengthened, Holt caterpillar. The ten Holt tractors were thus finally diverted to the production of the first French tanks of the Schneider CA1 model. The tanks were not equipped with the Breton-Prétot saw, as tests had shown that their tracks alone were sufficient to destroy barbed-wire.

Because of the connection with the Breton-Prétot saw, Breton convinced himself he had become the leading French expert on armoured vehicle design and considered himself to be the true inventor of the French tank. He felt rather piqued when Estienne took over "his" project. This caused him to cooperate with a rival of Estienne, Colonel Émile François Léon Rimailho, in the development of an alternative tank, the Saint-Chamond. In 1917 an Allied inter-parliamentary commission even concluded that Breton had a better claim to the invention of the tank than the British. In the postwar controversy on this subject Breton vociferously defended his position. Modern historians however, agree that the claim is unfounded.

== See also ==
- History of the tank
