= Saint-Chamond (tank) =

Heavy French tank of World War 1

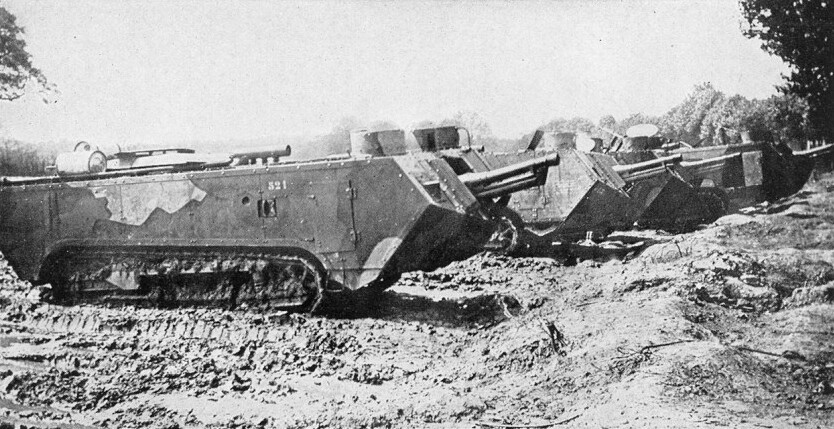
- Early model Saint-Chamond
- Type: Heavy tank
- Place of origin: France

Service history
- In service: 1917–1918
- Used by: France
- Wars: World War I

Production history
- Designed: 1915–1917
- Manufacturer: FAMH
- Produced: 1917–1918
- No. built: 400

Specifications
- Mass: 23 tonnes
- Length: 8.9 m
- Width: 2.7 m
- Height: 2.4 m
- Crew: 8-9 (Commander-Driver, Gunner-loader (or a gunner and a loader), assistant gunner/aimer, 4× machine gunners, mechanic)
- Armor: 11–19 mm
- Main armament: 1× 75 mm Field gun Mle 1897 (w/ 106 rounds)
- Secondary armament: 4× 8 mm Hotchkiss machine guns (w/ 78 belts of 96 rounds)
- Engine: 4-cylinder Panhard-Levassor (petrol); 70 kW (94 hp), Crochat-Colardeau electric transmission
- Power/weight: 3.0 kW/t (4 hp/t)
- Suspension: Coil spring
- Maximum speed: 12 km/h (7.5 mph)

The Saint-Chamond (French pronunciation: [sɛ̃ ʃamɔ̃]) was the second French tank to enter service during the First World War, with 400 manufactured from April 1917 to July 1918. It takes its name from the commune of Saint-Chamond where its manufacturers Compagnie des forges et aciéries de la marine et d'Homécourt (FAMH) were based.

Born of the commercial rivalry existing with the makers of the Schneider CA1 tank, the Saint-Chamond was an underpowered and fundamentally inadequate design. Its principal weakness was its Holt caterpillar tracks. They were much too short in relation to the vehicle's length and weight (23 tons). Later models attempted to rectify some of the tank's original flaws by installing wider and stronger track shoes, thicker frontal armour and the more effective 75mm Mle 1897 field gun.

Altogether 400 Saint-Chamond tanks were built, including 48 unarmed carrier "caisson" tanks. The Saint-Chamond tanks remained engaged in various actions until October 1918, belatedly becoming more effective since combat had moved out of the trenches and onto open ground. Eventually, the Saint-Chamond tanks were scheduled to be entirely replaced by imported British heavy tanks.

== Development ==
=== The Schneider ===
In January 1915, the French arms manufacturer Schneider sent its chief designer, Eugène Brillié, to investigate tracked tractors from the American Holt Company, at that time participating in a test programme in England. The original French project was to provide mobility to mechanical wire-cutting machines of the Breton-Pretot type. On his return Brillié, who had earlier been involved in designing armoured cars for Spain, convinced the company management to initiate studies on the development of a Tracteur blindé et armé ("armoured and armed tractor"), based on the Baby Holt chassis, two of which were ordered.

Experiments on the Holt caterpillar tracks started in May 1915 at the Schneider plant with a 56 kW (75 hp) wheel-steered model and the 34 kW (45 hp) all-caterpillar Baby Holt, showing the superiority of the latter. On 16 June, new experiments followed in front of the President of the French Republic, and on 10 September for Commander Ferrus, an officer who had been involved in the study (and ultimate abandonment) of the Levavasseur tank project in 1908.

In early 1916, the first prototype of the Schneider tank was assembled in an army workshop. It featured tracks from the American-made Holt caterpillar tractors that were already used in France for towing heavy artillery. Private Pierre Lescure designed the fighting compartment. Lieutenant Fouché lengthened the tracks to improve trench-crossing ability. In this early form the prototype of the Schneider was called Tracteur A - not for security reasons, but because nobody knew exactly how to call such vehicles; the French word char was not yet applied to tanks. Eugène Brillié, the chief designer at Schneider, rejected this Tracteur A prototype. Instead he had invented a tail for his own tank's chassis thus providing the same trench crossing ability but for less overall weight and length.

=== The Saint-Chamond ===
While Brillié began to assemble this second prototype which was to become the Schneider CA1, the arms manufacturer Forges et Aciéries de la Marine et d'Homécourt (aka "FAMH"), based at Saint-Chamond, Loire, was given an order for 400 tanks by the French government, a political move prompted by General Mourret of the Army "Service Automobile". Saint-Chamond intended to build a tank that would be partly similar to the Schneider. Brillié refused to share his patents for free, and Saint-Chamond refused to pay. As a result, the "Forges et Acieries de la Marine et d'Homecourt" company, being unable to replicate certain patented details (notably the tail) of the new Schneider tank, developed its own proprietary design: the "Char Saint-Chamond". It included a "Crochat-Colardeau" gasoline-electric transmission, a traction system already used on railcars in service with the French railways. Furthermore, the freedom to design a heavier and larger tracked vehicle gave Saint-Chamond the opportunity to upstage the Schneider company. It did this by installing on its "Char Saint-Chamond" a more powerful, full size 75 mm field gun plus 4 Hotchkiss machine guns instead of the two machine guns present on the Schneider tank.

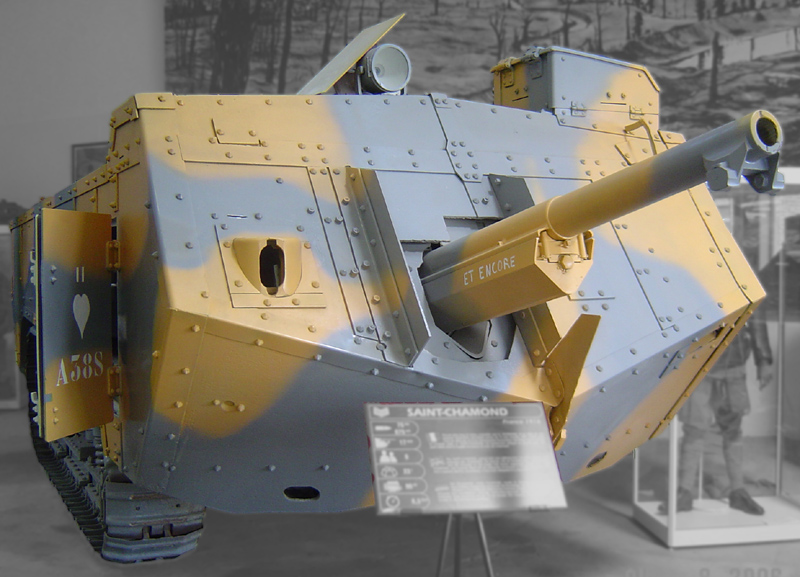
The Char Saint-Chamond on display at the Musée des Blindés in Saumur, the last surviving example

Saint-Chamond's technical director was Colonel Émile Rimailho, an artillery officer who had become dissatisfied over the insufficient reward he had received for helping design the famous Canon de 75 modele 1897 field gun as well as the Modele 1904 155 mm "Rimailho" howitzer. Following his departure from the French State arsenal system (APX) and joining Saint-Chamond, Rimailho adapted a Mondragon-designed 75 mm field gun for production for the Mexican Army. It was the proprietary Canon de 75mm TR Saint-Chamond (Modele 1915), designed to fire the regular French 75 mm ammunition. The French government had already made a commitment in May 1915 to purchase the Saint-Chamond 75mm gun. It is unclear whether the guns for the Saint-Chamond tanks were taken from existing stocks of Saint-Chamond guns or new production. Colonel Rimailho, who had a direct financial interest in selling his company's gun, induced the Ministry of War to specify that the new Saint-Chamond tank would also mount the Saint-Chamond made 75mm. In so doing Rimailho had also upstaged the Schneider CA1 tank which could only be fitted with a smaller Schneider-made fortress gun firing a 75 mm shell with reduced charge ammunition. To accommodate a regular length and full size 75 mm field gun, a hull longer than that of the Schneider tank was essential. The earliest Saint-Chamond prototype, a tracked vehicle longer and heavier than the Schneider tank was first demonstrated to the French military in April 1916.

When Colonel Jean Baptiste Eugène Estienne, who had taken the initiative to create the French tank arm, learned that an order for 400 additional tanks had been passed on April 8, 1916, he was at first quite elated. When it later became apparent that they would be of a different type, Estienne was shocked and wrote:

I am painfully surprised that an order has been launched of this importance without asking the opinion of the only officer who, at the time, had undertaken a profound study of the technical and military aspects involved and who had brought the supreme commander to the decision to take this path [towards a tank arm].

== Description ==
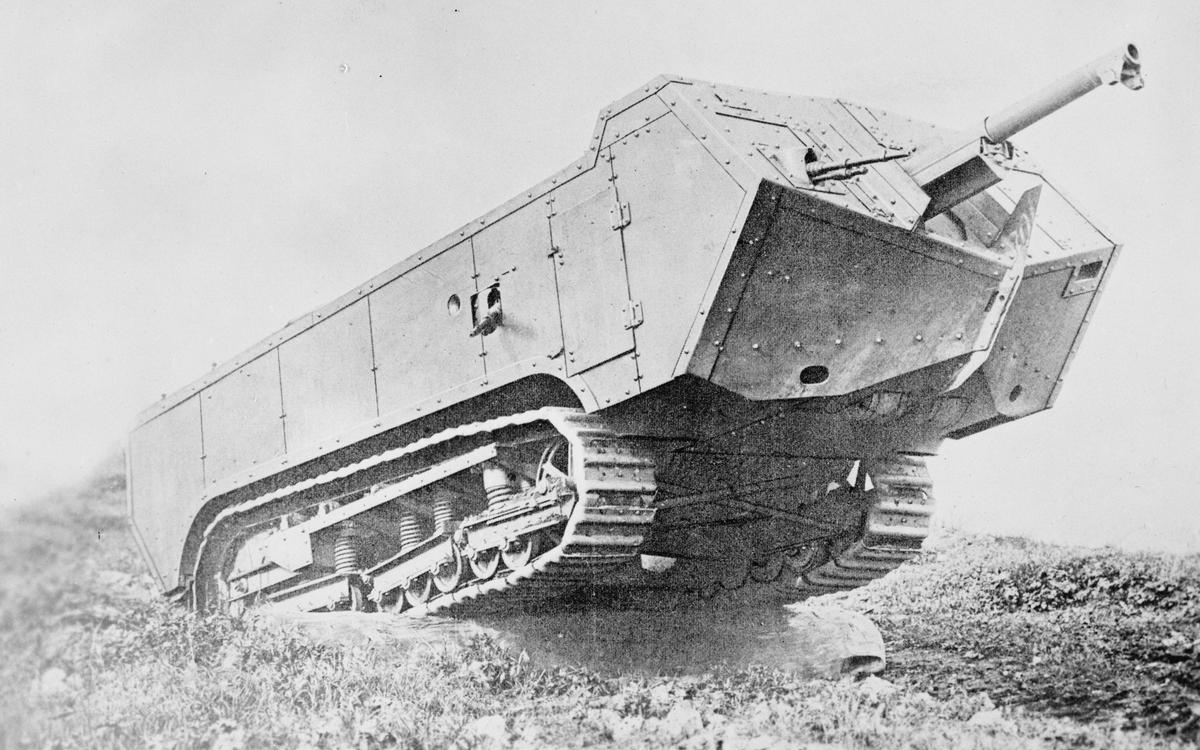
The Char Saint-Chamond showing the overhanging front hull and the later M.1897 75 mm field gun

As a result of Rimailho's manipulations, the new tank had become a rather cumbersome and underpowered vehicle. It lacked a rotating turret, instead using a large overhanging front compartment housing the long 75 mm gun protruding from the nose. All French 75mm field guns at the time used the same method of traverse control: the whole gun carriage moved from side to side, pivoted on the end of the trail by a worm gear arrangement on the axle of the gun. This meant that the Saint-Chamond engineers had no option but to fit the whole gun into the fighting compartment.

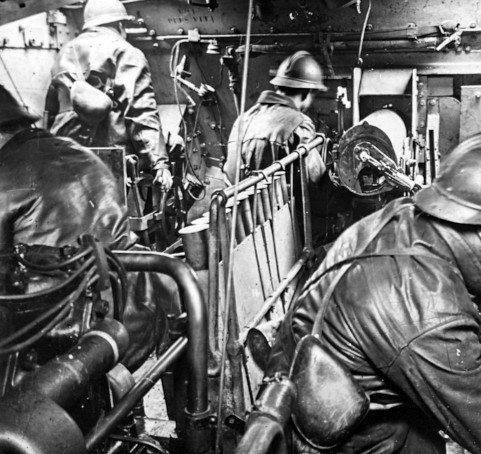
Interior of the Saint-Chamond tank equipped with the Mle 1897 gun

Within the forward fighting compartment and on the left was the driver, also the vehicle commander. On the right a machine gunner operated the front Hotchkiss machine gun. This machine gunner was also responsible for the breech operation of the 75 mm gun which he had to perform after pivoting on his seat to the left. A loader (referred to in some sources as the gunner) adjusted the gun's elevation, observing the target through a small hatch in the front of the tank, which left him vulnerable to enemy fire. Traversing the 75 mm gun beyond the limits of traverse of the gun (6° for Mle 1897) required traversing the whole tank, and this was performed by the driver. A second fighting compartment at the back held one machine gunner next to the secondary driver's position, where the tank could also be driven backwards by the mechanic in an emergency. Between those two compartments stood in the open the gasoline engine and the electric generator. Narrow passageways on both sides of the engine connected the front and rear compartments. The passageways also held Hotchkiss positions, one on each side in front of the engine. Altogether, the Saint-Chamond had four Hotchkiss Mle 1914 machine gun positions: one in the front, one in the back and one on each side of the tank.

Despite weighing 23 tons, the tank could manage a top speed of 12 kilometres per hour (7.5 mph). This speed was seldom achieved in the field as the long nose was prone to digging into the ground. The relatively high maximum speed on flat ground was made possible by the "Crochat Colardeau" transmission which coupled a Panhard-Levassor four-cylinder 67 kW (90 hp) sleeve-valve gasoline engine to an electric generator capable of giving an output of 260 amps under 200 volts. The generator was connected to two separate electric motors, one for each track, thus permitting perfect gradual steering of the tank.

Due to its short tracks and over-extended body, the vehicle experienced major difficulties in crossing trenches and overcoming obstacles. This led to such negative reactions by the crews in training that a special mention was passed on to General Headquarters:

Nobody wants to serve on the Saint-Chamond. Second Lieutenant de Gouyon, principal Saint-Chamond driving instructor at Marly, has publicly declared that it has become virtually impossible for him to continue to carry on and, since he is a Member of Parliament, that he will request to have the whole matter placed on the next parliamentary agenda.

== Improved Saint-Chamond tanks (1918) ==
Originally the crew of nine men was protected by 11 mm of steel armour on the sloping front and 17 mm on the sides. Later on, the addition of an extra layer of spaced 8.5 mm armour on the front improved protection. Beginning with the 151st vehicle, the roof was also redesigned with a double slope so that satchel charges and grenades would slide off. Concurrently, the original two observation turrets in front and on top were done away with and replaced by a single low profile square turret permitting front and sides vision by the tank's driver/commander. With time, the tracks were gradually widened in three iterations from 324 mm to 412 mm, and later to 500 mm, to lower the tank's ground pressure. After Saint-Chamond tank No 210 the more effective Model 1897 field gun was installed instead of Rimailho's self-designed 75 mm Saint-Chamond gun. At about the same time barrel-like rollers were added underneath the front and rear of the tank to help crossing trenches. This improved version was later called, unofficially, the Modèle 18. Production slowed down in March 1918, after at least 377 had been assembled, and ceased completely in July 1918.

Initially, forty eight Saint-Chamond tanks were modified as supply and recovery vehicles that could tow the lighter Schneider tanks. Their first action as a fighting vehicle took place at Laffaux Mill on May 5, 1917. Sixteen Saint-Chamond tanks were engaged there, several of them getting stuck in trenches, but only three were destroyed in combat. During the rest of the war, twelve groups in total were formed with Saint-Chamond tanks : Artillerie Spéciale Nos. 31–42. In mid-1918, since combat had left the trenches for the open fields, it was used to engage German field gun batteries (Nahkampfbatterien) at a distance with its 75 mm cannon. The Saint-Chamond proved at last quite effective in this specialist assault gun role. The Saint-Chamond's final engagement in battle, with initially 16 tanks, took place in early October 1918, in support of the U.S. First Division near Montfaucon. As reported in Ralph Jones et al. (1933) in reference to this last engagement : "The Saint Chamond tanks were handicapped by damage to their tracks, by derailments, by the breakage of the caps of connecting rods on forward bogies and of track pins". By that time, the Renault FT tank had taken over the major role in the French tank force and had also been purchased by the American Expeditionary Forces in France.

After the war 54 were allegedly rebuilt as ammunition carriers; the remainder were largely scrapped. Very little evidence exists that any were used postwar as ammunition carriers at all. However, at least one Saint-Chamond was retained as a memorial: there was one at the École des Chars at Versailles from 1919 to 1940 when the Germans presumably scrapped it along with the other tanks on display. There are unsubstantiated stories about Poland using the tank against the Red Army in 1920. If true, these specimens were in all probability not from the Soviet Army as the latter never had been supplied with them and the French Expeditionary Forces to Russia were equipped with only the Renault FT.

== Surviving example ==
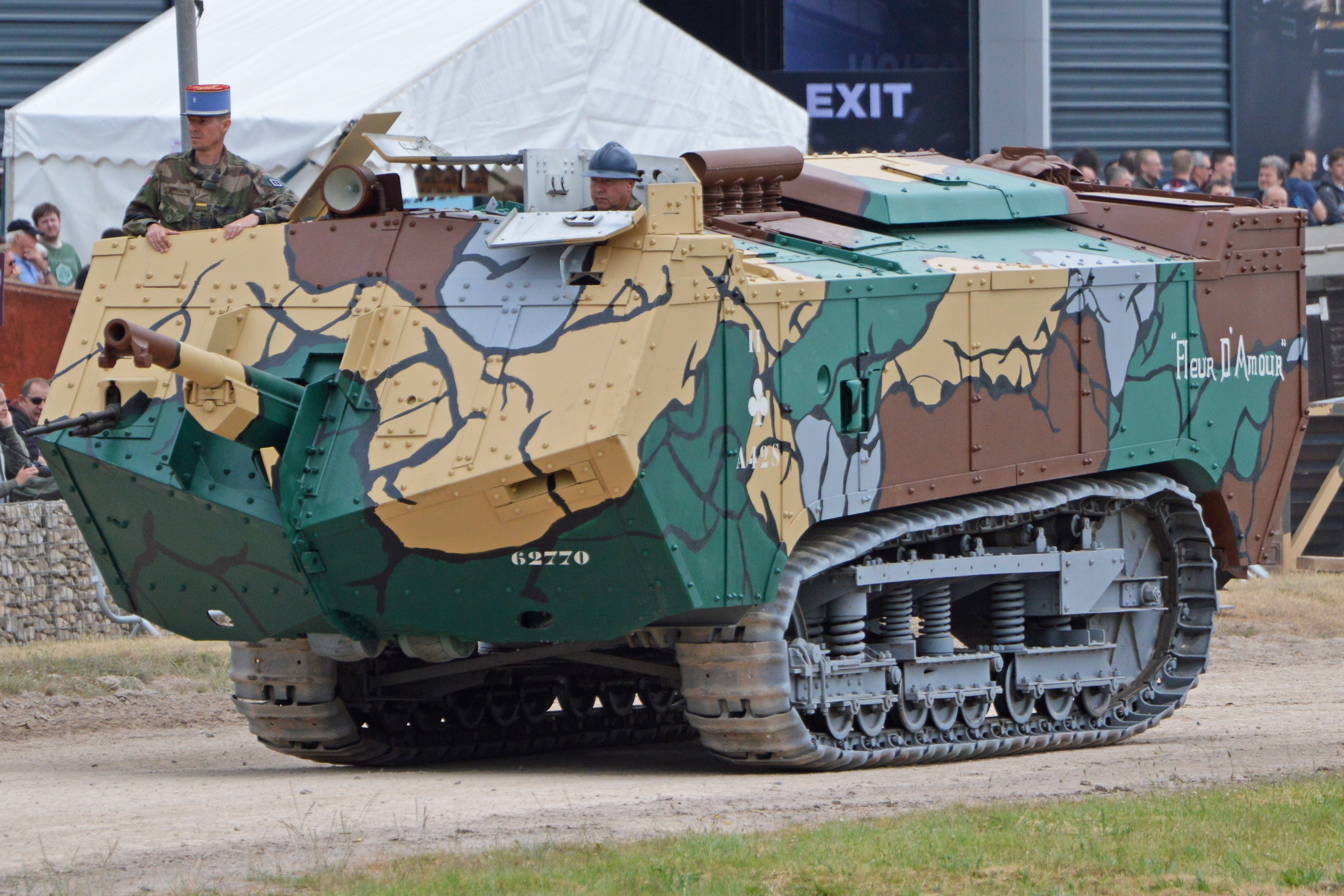
Last surviving Saint-Chamond taking part in TankFest 2017 in Bovington Camp, Dorset, UK

The last Saint-Chamond tank remaining in existence, an improved mid-1918 model, alongside other French tanks of World War I (Schneider CA1 and Renault FT), is preserved at the Musée des Blindés at Saumur. It had survived, together with a Schneider CA1 tank of the same vintage, at the Aberdeen Proving Grounds Ordnance Museum in Maryland, US, and was donated by the U.S. to the French government in 1987. Between 2015 and 2017 it was restored to running condition and repainted in a World War I camouflage scheme, at a cost of €120,000. It took part in various displays throughout 2017 to mark the centenary of the first use of tanks by the French army.

A full-size replica in polystyrene foam, built by students of the Lycée Le Corbusier at Tourcoing, is on display outdoors at the Historial de la Grande Guerre museum in Péronne, France.

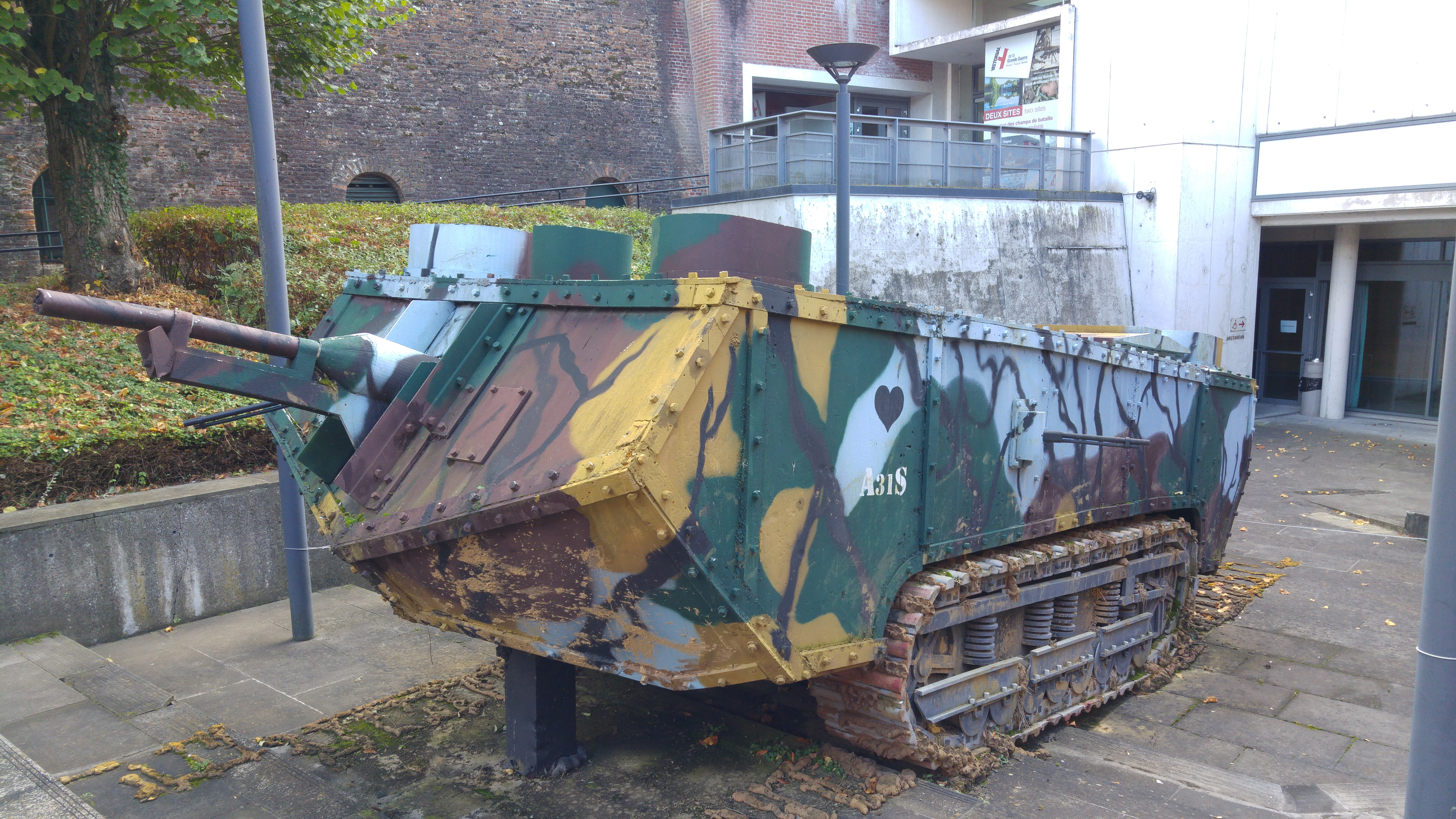
The Char Saint-Chamond replica on display at the Historial de la Grande Guerre

== In media ==
- The Saint-Chamond tank is featured and playable (under the abbreviation "St-Chamond") in the 2016 first-person shooter video game Battlefield 1, by DICE and Electronic Arts.
- The 2022 film All Quiet on the Western Front shows several Saint-Chamond tanks attacking a German trenchline. The film used practical replicas based on a BMP-1 chassis, as seen by the tracks being visibly different from the period-correct Saint-Chamond.
- The Saint-Chamond tank was added as an unlockable vehicle in Gaijin Entertainment's 2013 vehicular combat multiplayer game War Thunder during the 2025 April Fools event. In 2026 it was made unlockable again for a week between November 11th and November 18th.
