= Levavasseur project =

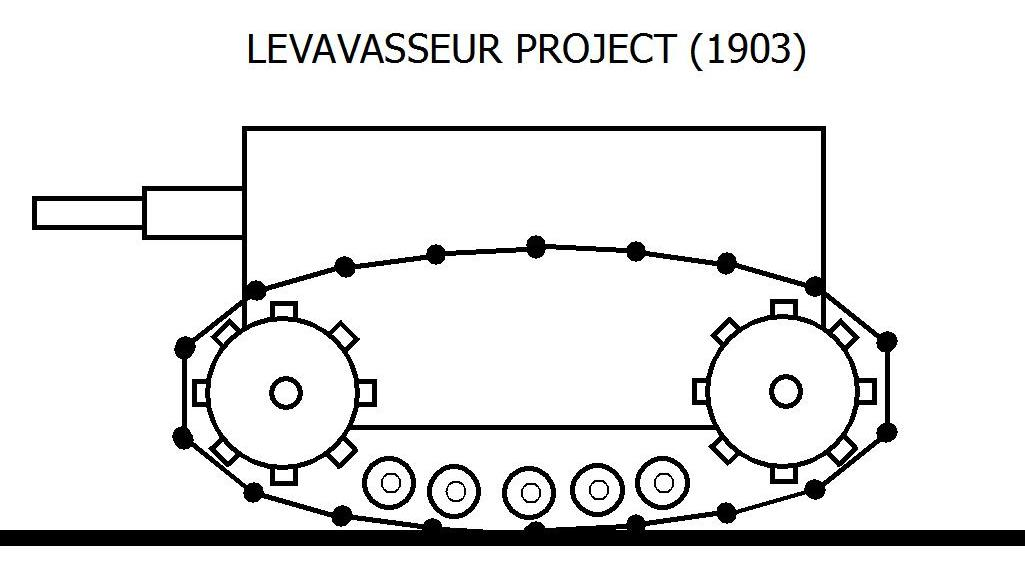
- The Levavasseur project.
- Type: Tank
- Place of origin: France

Service history
- In service: project only

Production history
- Designer: Captain L.R. Levavasseur
- Designed: 1903

Specifications
- Crew: 1 commander, 3 crew
- Main armament: 1 Canon de 75
- Engine: gasoline internal combustion engine 80 hp

The Levavasseur project was an early project for a tank designed in 1903 by the French Captain Léon René Levavasseur (1860-1942) of the 6th Artillery Battalion, described as a "self propelled cannon project" (French: Projet de canon autopropulseur). It is considered as the first description, made by a soldier, of what would come to be known as the tank. Levavasseur was a graduate of Ecole Polytechnique, of the promotion of 1881. According to Armoured Fighting Vehicles of the World:

A project for a vehicle which had all the characteristics later thought desirable in a tank was put forward to the French War Ministry as early as 1903. Devised by a Captain Levavasseur of the 6th Artillery Battalion, who called it a "canon autopropulseur", the vehicle was envisaged as carrying a 75mm gun mounted in a box-like steel caisson which ran on crawler tracks, or "roues articulées" as Levavasseur called them. Powered by an 80hp petrol engine, the Levavasseur machine would have had a crew of three, storage for ammunition, and a cross-country ability.

— Armoured Fighting Vehicles of the World, by Chris Ellis and Peter Chamberlain.

== Submission ==
The project was submitted to the French Technical Artillery Committee (Comité Général d'Artillerie), and after two years of study was presented to the Army Minister by the General President of the Committee. The general described the project in letter No.135, dated 1 February 1905:

The objective of the machine is to create an automobile artillery piece, capable of going over the rough terrain only accessible to horse carriages, and offering to the personnel and the engine parts a complete protection from indirect or small arms fire.

— General President of the Technical Artillery Committee to the Army Minister, 1 February 1905.

== Design ==
The locomotive mechanism is then described as a type of continuous track, supporting an armoured box with a weapon:

The all-terrain mobility necessary to this machine is achieved by a contraption equivalent to a wheel of very large diameter. This contraption, called an "articulated wheel", consist in a sort of rim composed of wedge-shaped blocks ("voussoirs") connected together by bolts around which they can rotate, and with an elastic connection tending to close up the space between the voussoirs. The faces of the links adjacent to the ground serve as the "sole" of the wheel, and the links opposite form a race ("Chemin de roulement"). These two faces are cylindrical and concentric. Those forming the sole have a radius of four meters. These faces form two continuous surfaces when the blocks are connected.

A box is positioned with rollers on the races of the two identical articulated wheels. The rollers are positioned so as to maintain the natural shape of the articulated wheels.

Besides these rollers, the box supports two sprockets on each side, the teeths of which mesh with the bolts of the links. They are rotated by an 80hp engine.

The box, made of bulletproof steel, hold an artillery piece of 75mm on a special gun carriage. It transports one commander, three servants and ammunitions.

— General President of the Technical Artillery Committee to the Army Minister, 1 February 1905.

== Reception ==
The Artillery Technical Committee raised three major objections:

1. All-terrain machines had not to that day given satisfaction.
2. Hard objects could enter the mechanism and damage it.
3. Direction could not be properly controlled.

Overall, it was not felt that there was a demand for such a machine, and horsedrawn artillery was considered adequate.

== Aftermath ==
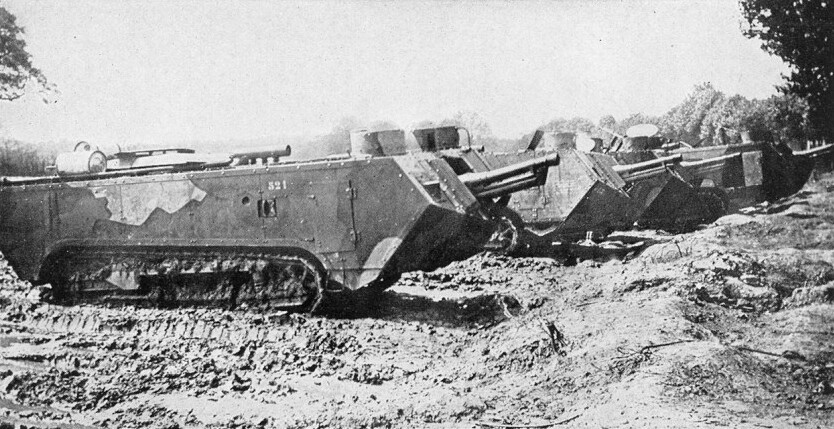
The 1916 Saint-Chamond tank bore some resemblance to the Levavasseur project in layout, armament (Canon de 75), motorization (80hp engine) and general silhouette.

Levavasseur reworked his mechanism, improved its resistance to hard objects, and brought forward a new improved project in 1908. He estimated an outlay of 14,000 francs for the construction of a mock-up.

Eventually, the project was completely rejected. A letter dated 13 August 1908 explained that a tractor on continuous tracks was now available from a British company, Richard Hornsby & Sons.

It is unclear whether General Estienne, the French "Father of the tank" ever knew about this project. However, Commandant Léonce Ferrus, who wrote the rejection report, participated in the Schneider tank experiments on 10 September 1915, and in 1916 became involved with the development of the Saint-Chamond tank, which bore what Gougaud describes as "disturbing similarities" to the Levavasseur project, such as layout, armament (Canon de 75), power plant (80 hp engine) and general silhouette.

Levavasseur became a lieutenant colonel of artillery, and retired simply expressing his regret that his views had not been taken into consideration earlier, before the advent of World War I.

== See also ==
- History of the tank
