= Gradis =

Gradis is a surname. Notable people with the surname include:

- Gaston Gradis (1889-1968), French businessman and explorer
- Henri Gradis (1823-1905), French businessman and historian
- Raoul Gradis (1861-1943), French shipowner, painter, composer
