= Cortier =

Cortier is a surname. Notable people with this name include:

- Benoit Cortier, French race car driver in the 2004 Formula Renault seasons
- Lucien Cortier, fictional character in The Face at the Window (1939 film)
- Véronique Cortier, French mathematician and computer scientist

== See also ==
- Poste Maurice Cortier, a train stop in Algeria
