= Sniper shield =

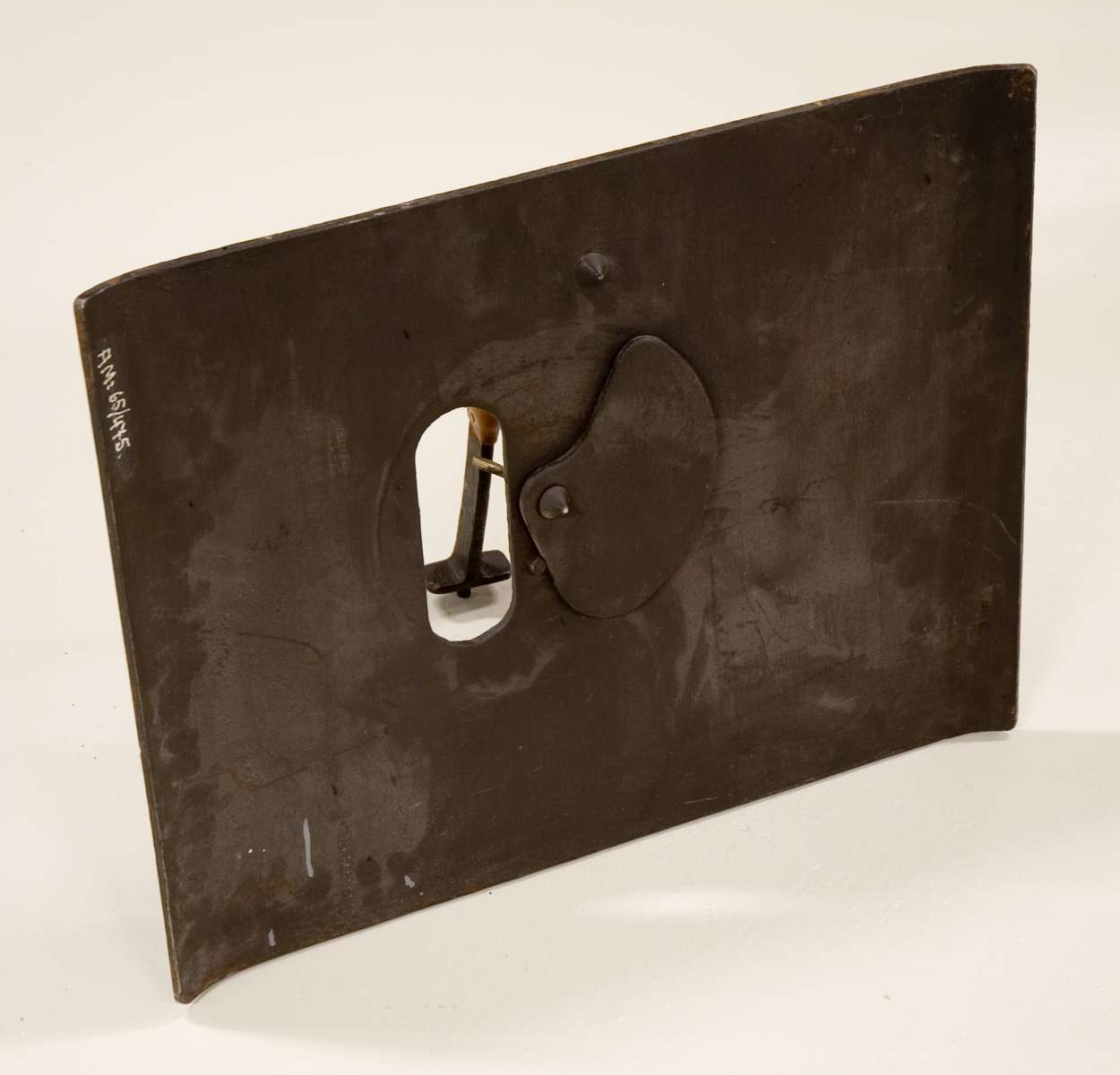
Swedish infanterisköld m/1920

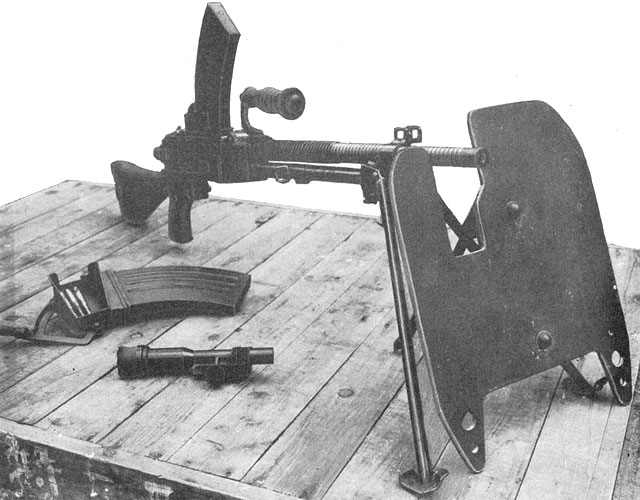
Japanese Type 99 (1939) sniper shield with a Type 96 light machine gun

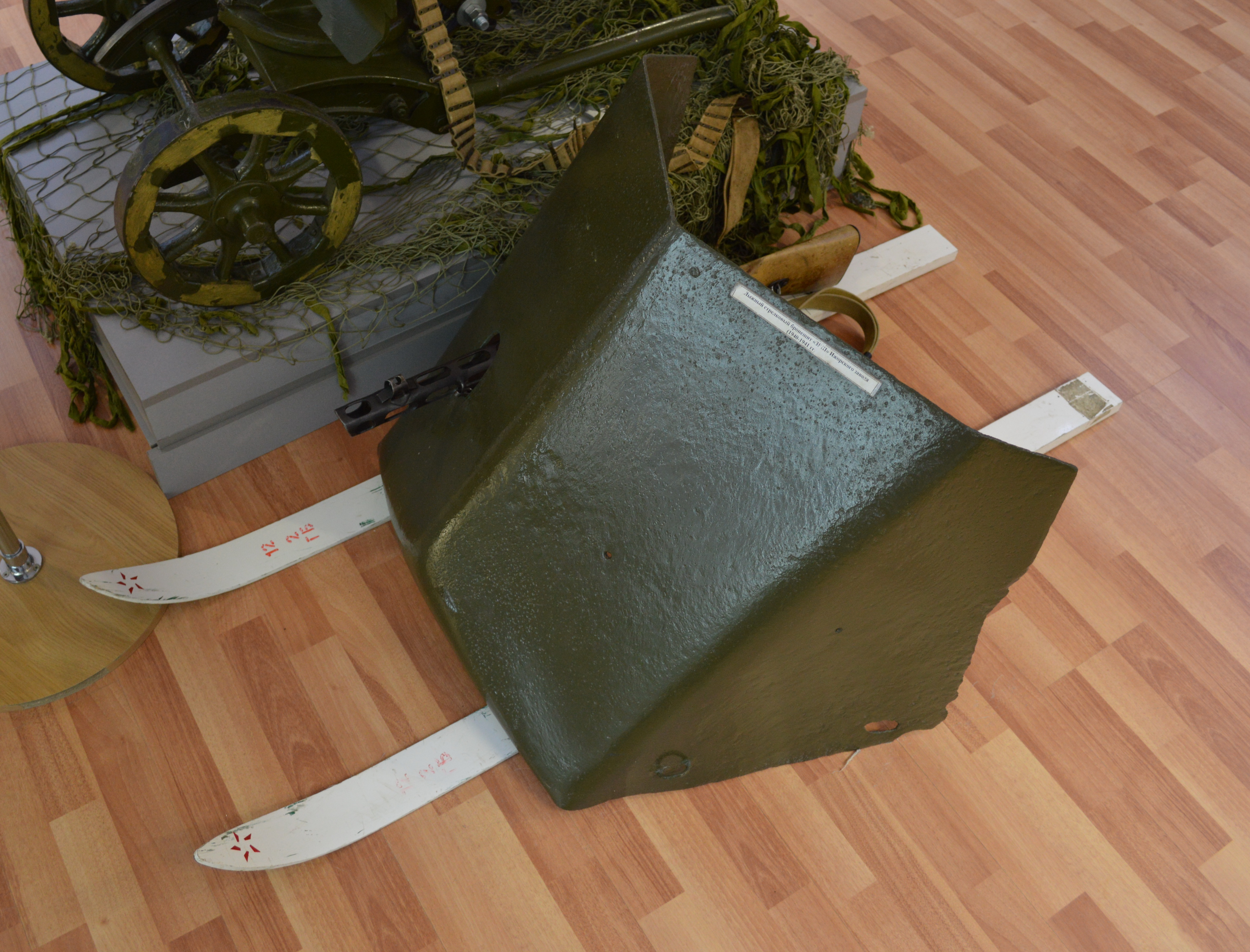
Finnish WWII sniper shield with skis

A sniper shield, periodically also trench shield (depending on the specific use), is an early 20th century-era type of set-shield for infantry, made of a steel armor plate, and featuring an embrasure or thereof for a rifle or machine gun, similar to a gun shield. Popularized during World War I, such intended to protect the user from enemy rifle fire, but was often too clunky and heavy to be practically moved by its user. Some experiments tried to outfit such with skis or wheels so they could be dragged.

An unpopular experiment was the MacAdam Shield Shovel, attempting to combine the concept of a sniper shield with the blade of a shovel.

Sniper shields were never popular, and in Sweden, a specific case saw them reused as armor for a couple of improvised armored cars.

== See also ==
- Gun shield
- Ballistic shield
- Mobile personnel shield
- Mantlet
