= McAdam =

McAdam or MacAdam may refer to:

== People ==
- McAdam (surname)

== Places ==
=== Canada ===
- McAdam, New Brunswick
  - McAdam station, a National Historic Site in the village.
- McAdam Parish, New Brunswick
- McAdams Lake, Nova Scotia

=== United States ===
- McAdam, Virginia
- McAdam, Washington

== Other ==
- Macadam, a method of road building.
- MacAdam ellipse, the region of chromaticity representing just noticeable differences to the human eye.
- MacAdam Shield Shovel, a shovel used by the Canadian army during First World War.
- Macadamia nut, named after John Macadam
