= SFCO =

SFCO is a four-letter abbreviation that may refer to any of the following:

- San Francisco Chamber Orchestra
- Santa Fe Community Orchestra
- Société française pour le commerce avec l'Outre-mer, a French trading house
- Sucsy, Fischer & Company (SFCo), a Chicago area-based independent investment banking firm
