= SWAT-Bot =

Mobile shield

A SWAT-Bot is an automated mobile personnel shield used by paramilitary forces such as SWAT teams for ballistic protection for methods of entry. They are manufactured by Howe & Howe Technologies.

== Development ==
The SWAT-Bot was first developed in 2012 as the RS1-RBS1 robotic ballistic shield.

== See also ==
- History of the tank
- Ballistic shield
- Riot shield
- Mantlet
