= Jean Baptiste Eugène Estienne =

French general and military engineer (1860-1936)

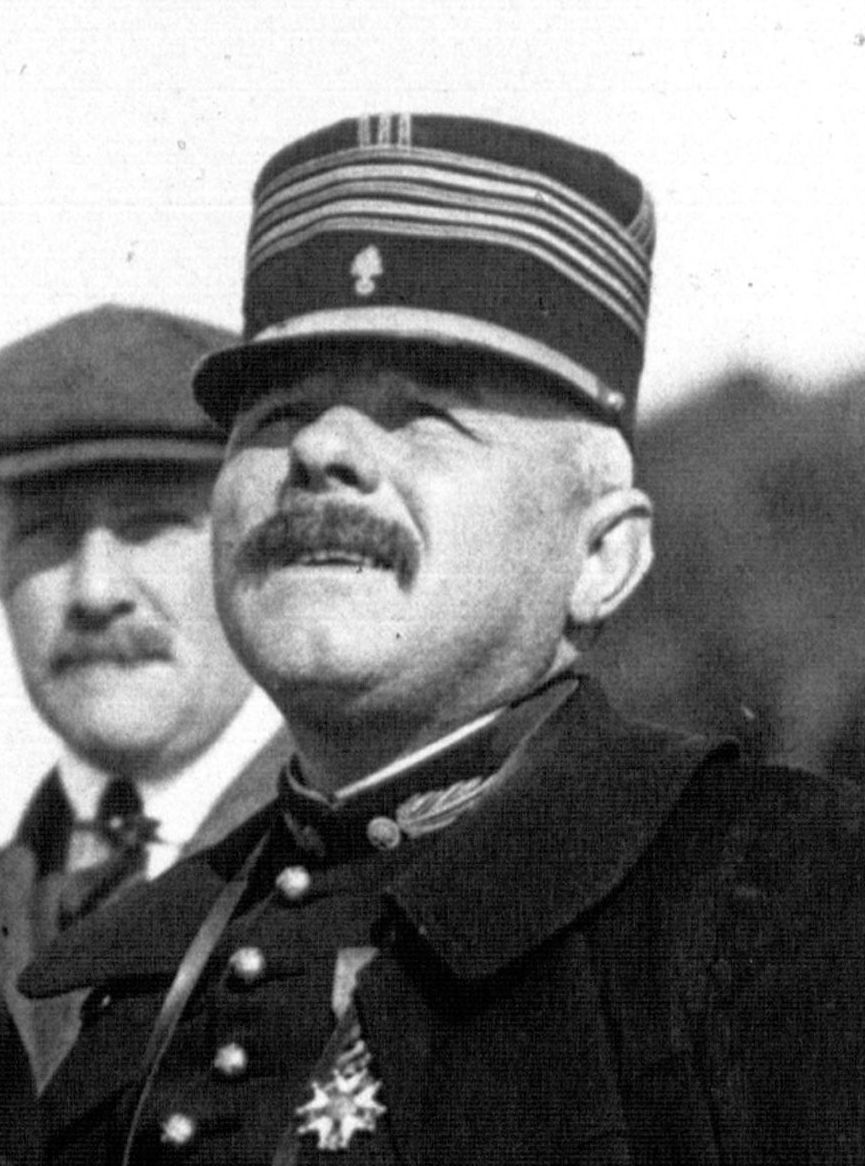
- Born: 7 November 1860; Condé en Barrois, France
- Died: 2 April 1936 (aged 75); Paris
- Military career
- Allegiance: France
- Branch: French Army
- Service years: 1882–1927
- Rank: General of Artillery

Jean Baptiste Eugène Estienne (Note: Estienne's forenames are frequently incorrectly given as Jean-Baptiste Eugène. He was christened with the three names Jean, Baptiste, and Eugène, but disliked the name Baptiste, and preferred to be addressed as Eugène. He usually signed himself J.E. Estienne. See Mondet, Arlette Estienne: Le général J.B.E. Estienne, père des chars. L'Harmattan, 2010) (7 November 1860 in Condé-en-Barrois, Meuse – 2 April 1936 in Paris) was a general of artillery and a specialist in military engineering, one of the founders of modern French artillery and French military aviation, and the creator of the French tank arm. He is considered by many in France to be the Père des Chars (Father of the Tank).

== Early life ==
Estienne was born at Condé-en-Barrois (now Les Hauts-de-Chée) in the Meuse valley. He was admitted to the École Polytechnique (the French Military Academy) at the age of nineteen. He graduated 131st of his year in 1882, the same year he won first prize in the national mathematics competition. He would for the rest of his life be interested in mathematical and philosophical problems, but his real passion was Greek Antiquity.

== Military career ==
=== Modern artillery ===
He joined the French army as a second lieutenant in 1883, serving with the artillery from 1884. Studying ballistics, he presented his first major work in 1890, Erreurs d'Observation, to the Académie des Sciences; this stimulated the introduction of modern indirect fire methods.

Promoted to Captain with the 1st Artillery Regiment in 1891, he began to develop telemetric instruments at the Bourges arsenal to put his theories into practice. He was made squadron commander with the 19th Artillery Regiment in 1902, but his real work was done as head of the workshop building precision instruments for the technical artillery section in Paris, and promoting the use of telephonic connections to enable the artillery to switch targets quickly. This work did not keep him from publishing a paper on Pascal's theorem in 1906. He became head of the artillery school at Grenoble in 1907.

=== Military Aviation ===
At that time Estienne was already reputed to be one of the most competent and progressive officers in France, and one of the founders of modern artillery. When General Brun created the French aviation service at Reims in 1909, the logical candidate to command this new unit was Estienne. Since the main task of aircraft was seen as directing artillery fire, he seemed to be best qualified to solve the technological difficulties involved. So Estienne, now promoted to Lieutenant-Colonel, also became one of the founders of French military aviation. After establishing the proper organisation, training and production of aircraft while developing communication methods, he commanded the 5th Aviation Group at Lyon for a short time. But he was recalled to the arsenal of Vincennes to continue his technical work — although he could not resist founding a new artillery aviation section there.

== First World War ==
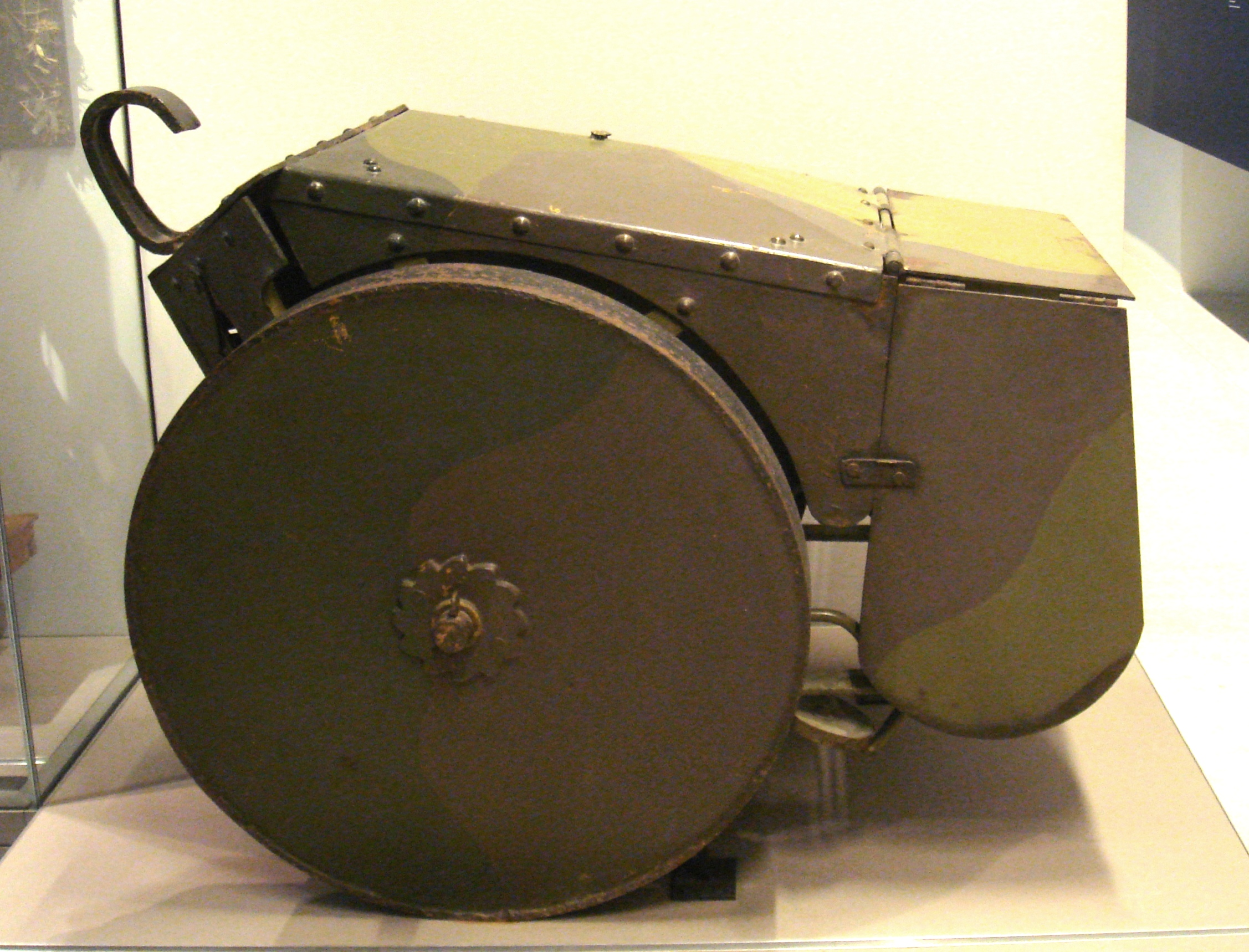
A World War I mobile personnel shield.

At the outbreak of the First World War Estienne was made commander of the 22nd Artillery Regiment serving with Philippe Pétain's division. At the Battle of Charleroi he shocked his German opponents by the precision of his artillery fire, which was well directed due to close cooperation with aircraft. But even Estienne's competence could not save the French infantry from being destroyed by machine gun fire. In order to protect soldiers in trench warfare, he imagined mobile personnel shields to assist them.

Having long been an advocate of indirect fire methods, Estienne now began to search for viable ways to provide close support with field guns. On 23 August he made his famous statement Messieurs, la victoire appartiendra dans cette guerre à celui des deux belligérants qui parviendra le premier à placer un canon de 75 sur une voiture capable de se mouvoir en tout terrain ("Gentlemen, the victory in this war will belong to which of the two belligerents which will be the first to place a gun of 75 [mm] on a vehicle able to be driven on all terrain"). However, as suitable vehicles were lacking at the time, nothing more could be done.

In the summer of 1915 he learned that Eugène Brillié of the Schneider Company and Jules-Louis Bréton (then a member of parliament) were developing a barbed wire-cutter on a tracked Holt-type chassis. He wrote several letters during the autumn of 1915 to Joseph Joffre at GQG (the French GHQ) with his ideas about using such tracked vehicles. These letters never got further than Joffre's staff.

On 1 December 1915 Estienne wrote a personal letter to Joffre, in which he proposed that the French army undertake a similar project. In particular, he advocated the creation of a force of all-terrain armoured vehicles large enough to assist 20,000 infantrymen to break through the full depth of a German defensive position. Armed with light artillery, the vehicles would also serve to transport men, equipment and supplies across the 40 km or so that separated French assembly areas from the open terrain behind the German defensive positions.

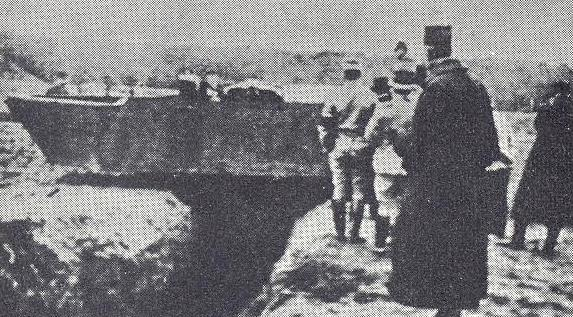
The Souain tank prototype crossing a trench on 9 December 1915. Colonel Estienne attended these decisive trials

He was invited to explain his ideas further to Joffre's Deputy Chief of Staff, General Maurice Janin, during a personal visit on 12 December. Three days earlier, he and Pétain had attended a demonstration of the chassis of the Schneider CA tank. He realized that unknown to him Schneider had been constructing an armoured tracked vehicle since May, and immediately understood that the existence of such a prototype, even though incomplete, might well prove a decisive argument for the creation of an armoured force. He was proven right on 20 December when an official plan was conceived to produce the Schneider CA. The same day he contacted Louis Renault to convince him to build tanks, but the industrialist refused. During a personal visit to Joffre on 18 January 1916 he convinced the supreme commander that the plan was sound.

Estienne himself was not at first personally involved in the development of the new tanks. He suggested some ideas that were duly taken notice of, but otherwise had no effect on the preparations for construction and production. Two of his personal enemies, Undersecretary Jean-Louis Bréton (who resented that Estienne had taken over his project) and Colonel Emile Rimailho (the co-inventor, with Deport and General St. Claire Deville, of the famous French 75 mm field gun), cooperated to build the ill-fated Saint-Chamond tank.

During a chance meeting on 16 July, Renault informed him that his company was developing a light tank (the Renault FT), but Estienne was not in a position to make any promises. In August he and Bréton traveled together to London, where they tried to convince the British government to postpone the first use of tanks until the French tanks were ready. They were unsuccessful, but the British action had a beneficial side effect in that the first use of the British Mark I tanks on 15 September created a euphoria that accelerated developments and on 30 September Estienne was appointed Commander of the Artillerie Spéciale: the French army's tank arm. He was duly promoted on 17 October.

At the time there was a lack of personnel and materiel and Estienne spent many months creating the new force from scratch: first recruiting personnel, then constructing training grounds and waiting till 1 December for the first Schneider CA tank to be delivered so that training could begin in earnest. During these months he cooperated with Renault in developing the Renault FT, and tried to block efforts by General Mourret to mass-produce superheavy tanks (the later Char 2C), which threatened to swallow the available production capacity.

On 16 April 1917 he was forced by the new supreme commander, Robert Nivelle, to commit his armoured force prematurely near Berry-au-Bac, leading to a complete failure. The officer commanding the attack, Commandant Louis Bossut, was killed; a large monument there commemorates all French tank crewmen who died in World War I. This disaster nearly led to the abolition of the tank force; Estienne was only saved by the appointment of his friend Pétain as Commander-in-Chief.

Estienne now directed his mind to the creation of appropriate tactics for the use of tanks. He considered that the tanks most important role was to act as mobile artillery, capable of moving over the ravaged battlefields and breaking through enemy lines, without any "softening up" artillery support. Heavier tanks might be useful for this but a more efficient effort could be made by a "swarm" of lighter and faster vehicles. Estienne paid little attention to exploitation.

A large number of Renault FTs was finally made available in 1918. This allowed the French to counterattack effectively for the first time since 1914. The FT subsequently became the Char de la Victoire and the necessity for a strong tank force became firmly established.

== Post war ==
Estienne submitted to Pétain a proposal in 1919 titled Study of the Missions of Tanks in the Field. This stressed the need for armoured, tracked support vehicles to carry infantry, artillery and recovery teams alongside the tanks, and also for the need for aircraft to conduct an in-depth bombardment of the enemy. This was somewhat advanced for the time, and presaged Tukhachevsky's ideas of the 1930s.

After the war Estienne held command of French tank forces until 1927, first as Artillerie Spéciale, then as commander of the Chars when in 1920 all tanks were made part of the Infantry by law. At a conference in Brussels in 1921 he called for a 100,000 man force equipped with 4,000 tanks and 8,000 transport vehicles that could break an enemy's front and advance 80 km in a single night. However, the military establishment in France believed in rigid infantry-oriented warfare and his appeal went unheeded.

Although politician Paul Reynaud supported progressive ideas like those of Estienne and called for a mobile army that could take the offensive as early as 1924, he represented a minority position in the French parliament. French military doctrine still relegated tanks to the role of supporting the infantry, a situation that did not change until Weygand took command. Indeed, Estienne criticized the idea of tanks supporting infantry until his death in 1936.

=== The Compagnie Générale Transsaharienne ===
In May 1923 he was made president of the Compagnie Générale Transsaharienne (CGT), formed by Gaston Gradis to promote travel across the Sahara by car and airplane. His sons Georges and René participated in several exploratory expeditions sponsored by this company from Adrar, Algeria to Gao, Niger and further south.

== Legacy ==
Estienne is revered in France as the "Father of the Tanks". Rue du Général Estienne in the 15th Arrondissement in Paris is named after him. Several military stations and posts have also borne his name and the largest tank museum in the world, the Musée des Blindés in Saumur, is called "Musée Général Estienne".

== Bibliography ==
- Krause, Jonathan; Philpott, William (2023). French Generals of the Great War: Leading the Way. Pen and Sword Books. ISBN 978-1781592526.

== Notes ==
Citations
