= Société française pour le commerce avec l'Outre-mer =

French investment company

- Trade name: SFCO
- Formerly: Maison Gradis
- Industry: Investment
- Founded: 1685
- Founder: Diego Gradis
- Headquarters: France

The Société française pour le commerce avec l'Outre-mer (SFCO) is a French investment company, formerly a trading company. It has its origins in the Gradis merchant house, established in 1685 and headed by members of the Gradis family.

== Maison Gradis ==
The Gradis family was Jewish, and had probably moved to Bordeaux from Portugal around 1495. Diego Gradis founded a trading company in 1685. His son David Gradis (1665–1751) inherited the concern ten years later. He bought his first ship, Le Tigre, in England in 1711. This was followed by a long line of armed trading vessels. David Gradis abandoned the trade in cloth and entered trade with the colonies with his Compagnie David Gradis et fils. He sent wine, brandy, flour, lard and salted Irish beef, and obtained in return refined and raw sugar, among other items.

In 1722 David Gradis launched a commercial business in Saint-Pierre, Martinique, and in 1724 opened a branch in Saint-Domingue. The company engaged in a triangular trade. It loaded salted meat, wines and spirits in Bordeaux, which it took to the French and American ports. En route, the ships made a discreet visit to Gorée Island on the coast of Dakar, where they purchased slaves directly from the officials there. In 1748 the Gradis house established itself on Gorée and became a major participant in the slave trade with the Americas. The bankers Cottin, Banquet et Mallet gave solid support to David Gradis and his son Abraham (c. 1699–1780), which allowed them to open the facility on Gorée. Despite laws discriminating against Jews in the colonies, the family became so powerful that the colonial government exempted it from the prohibition against owning land.

In Martinique the Gradis family owned a home in Basse-Pointe and devoted itself to cultivation and manufacture of cane sugar. The Gradis house corresponded with all the main markets of Europe, and were prominent in trade between France and the Caribbean, Canada and the United States. From before the French Revolution the family was recognized as leaders of the French Jewish community. During the Seven Years' War (1756–63) the Maison Gradis helped France by dispatching supply ships to Canada. The company had granted large amounts of credit to kings Louis XV and Louis XVI, and in return received exceptional privileges. In the years 1764–70 the company was called upon to supply the colonies, and to introduce gold to the islands that they needed to expand their trade.

The company suffered large losses after the French Revolution of 1789, but recovered. By 1892 the company was selling sugar from several producers in Bordeaux, Nantes and Marseille. Henri Gradis (1823–1905) was deputy mayor of Bordeaux. He wrote a history of Bordeaux and several literary works. He was succeeded by Raoul Gradis. In 1899 Raoul's sister Esther Lucie Gabrielle Alice Emma Gradis (1866–1925) married Georges Julien Schwob d'Héricourt. Raoul Gradis succeeded his father as head of the Maison Gradis 1905, working with Georges Schwob d'Héricourt. During World War I (1914–18) the Germans occupied the regions of France where sugar beet were grown. The French government gave the Maison Gradis the warrant to ensure France's entire supply of sugar. This arrangement continued until 1920.

== Post World War I ==
In 1921 Raoul Gradis and Georges Schwob d'Héricourt changed the name of David Gradis et Fils to the Société française pour le commerce avec les colonies et l'étranger (SFCCE). Georges Schwob d'Héricourt was president and Raul Gradis vice-president. Gaston Gradis (1889–1968) was a polytechnicien and great traveler, particularly in Morocco with Marshall Hubert Lyautey. Jean Schwob d’Héricourt (1900–80) was active in the French Resistance during World War II (1939–45).

In 1957 the SFCCE became the Société française pour le commerce avec l'Outre-mer (SFCO). In 1975, with West Indian sugar production gradually declining, the company again entered the trade in Bordeaux wine. In 2005 the company left this business and focused on financial investments. As of 2014 it was headed by Henry Gradis, a direct descendant of the founder.

== List of directors ==
- 1685-1695: Diego Gradis
- 1695-1751: David Gradis
- 1751-1780: Abraham Gradis
- 1780-1788: Moïse Gradis
- 1788-1811: David Gradis
- 1811-1858: Benjamin Gradis
- 1858-1905: Henri Gradis
- 1905-1921: Raoul Gradis
- 1921-1940: Georges Schwob d'Héricourt
- 1940-1956: General Jean Ménard
- 1956-1972: Jean Schwob d'Héricourt
- 1972- : Henri Gradis

== See also ==
- List of French colonial trading companies
- List of chartered companies

== Sources ==
- "181AQ. GRADIS (Maison)". Archives Nationales.
- Bennett, Ralph G. (2014). "Histoire des juifs des Caraïbes".
- Bunge Molina y Vedia, Carlos Federico (2013-01-16). "Esther Lucie Gabrielle Alice Emma Gradis". Geni.
- Coutte, Alain (2005-01-17). "La cas de David Gradis, négrier français dans le négoce d¹esclaves vers le Nouveau Monde, fondateur d¹une dynastie".
- "Maison GRADIS à Bordeaux" (PDF). Archives Nationales.
- Schoenberg, Randy (2012-06-21). "Raoul Gradis". Geni.
- "SFCO (Ancienne Maison Gradis)". Les Hénokiens.
- "Société française pour le commerce avec l'outre-mer Ancienne Maison GRADIS fondée en 1685". Historia. Archived from the original on 2015-09-24.
