= Mobile personnel shield =

WWI personal protection devices

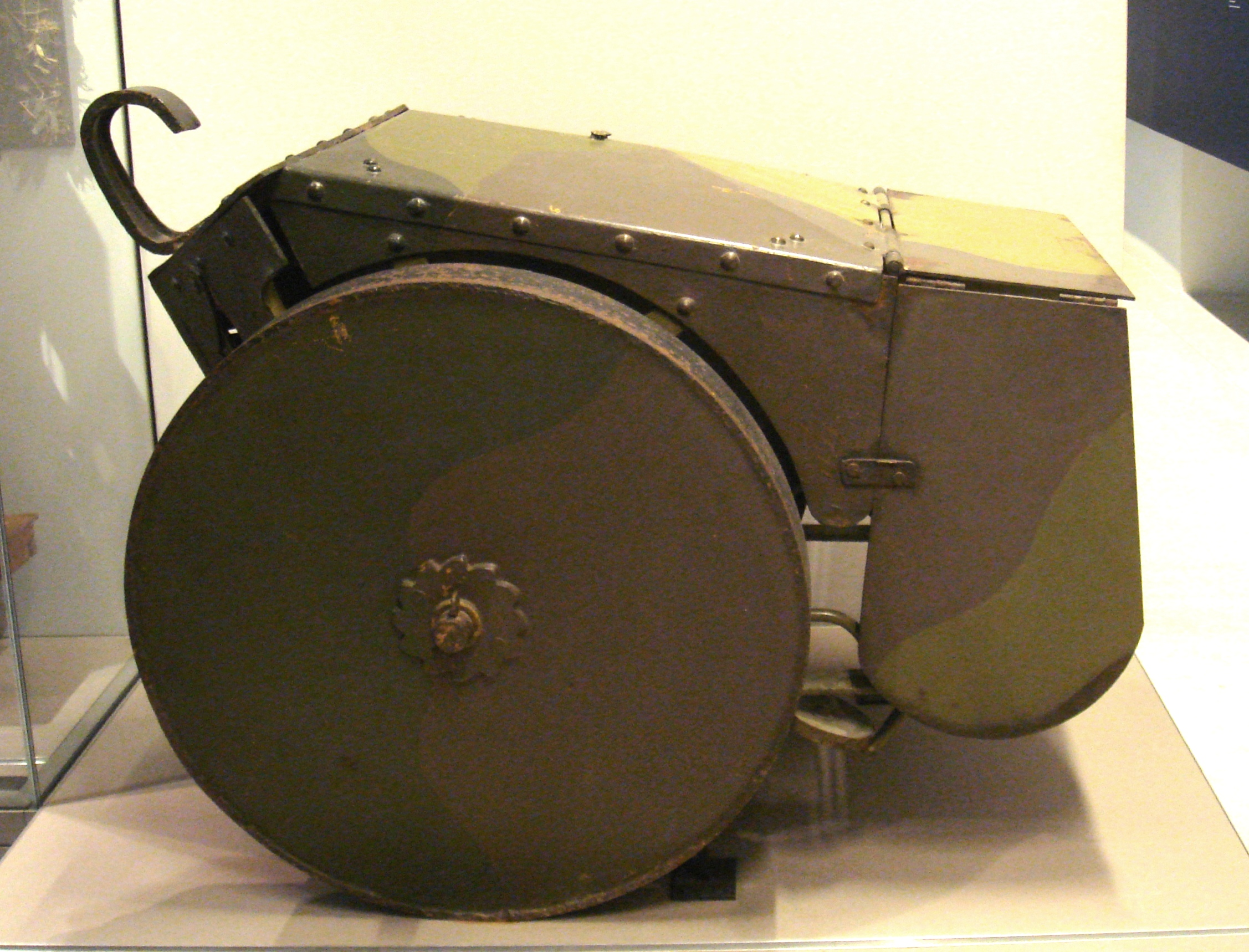
Mobile personnel shield.

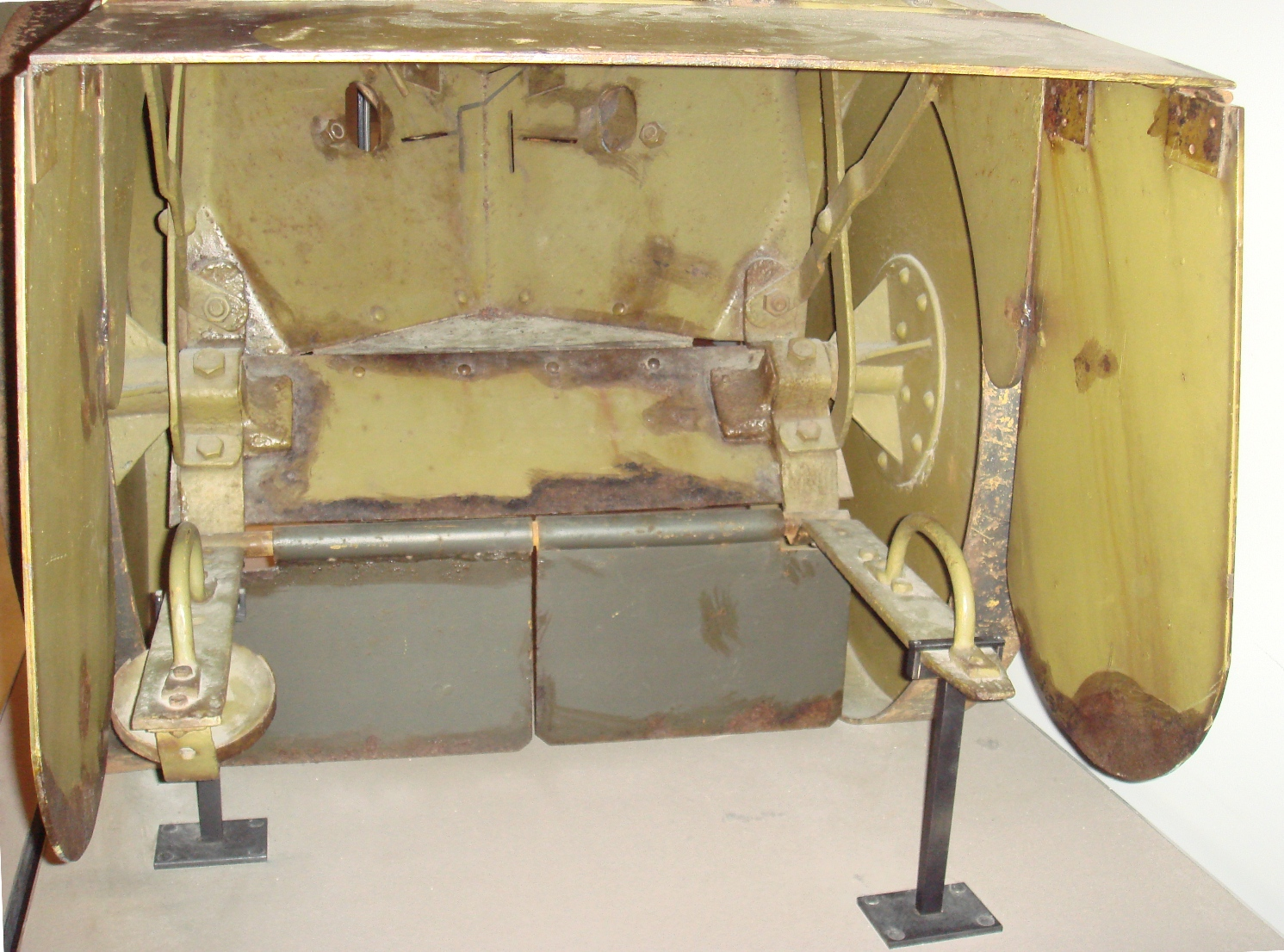
Mobile personnel shield (interior).

A mobile personnel shield is a type of bulletproof shield equipped with wheels. Such devices were employed experimentally during the trench warfare of World War I.

The immobility of the trench warfare characterizing the First World War led to a need for a device that would protect soldiers from enemy fire and could help them move on the extremely irregular terrain of battlefields. The French colonel Jean Baptiste Eugène Estienne considered armed cross-country vehicles such as the future tank as early as August 1914, but also imagined mobile personnel shield to assist individual soldiers.

Apart from a few exceptional cases, these mobile personnel shields proved too cumbersome and heavy for the strength of an individual under fire, and would only work on short distances and on favourable ground.

== See also ==
- Sniper shield
- Gun shield – Piece of armor designed to be mounted on a crew-served weapon
- History of the tank – Chronicle of armoured combat vehicles
- SWAT-Bot – Mobile shield
- Ballistic shield – Police and military anti-projectile shields
- Brewster Body Shield – Prototype World War I body armor
- Riot shield – Protection device
- Mantlet – Movable defensive structure in medieval warfare
