= Tanezrouft =

Coordinates: 22.251°N 2.246°W

Tanezrouft تنزروفت
- Natural region
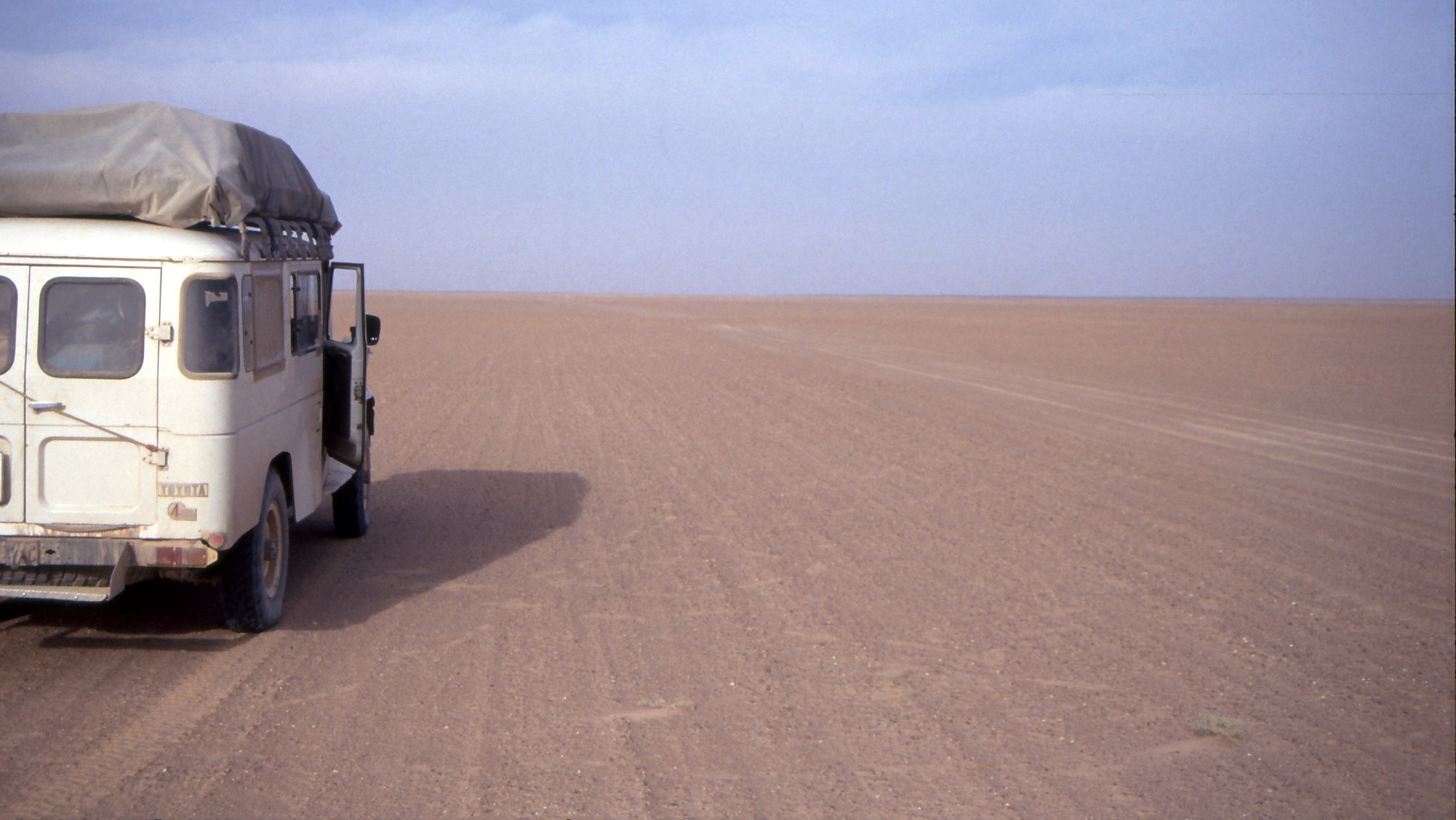
- Car in the Tanezrouft in Mali

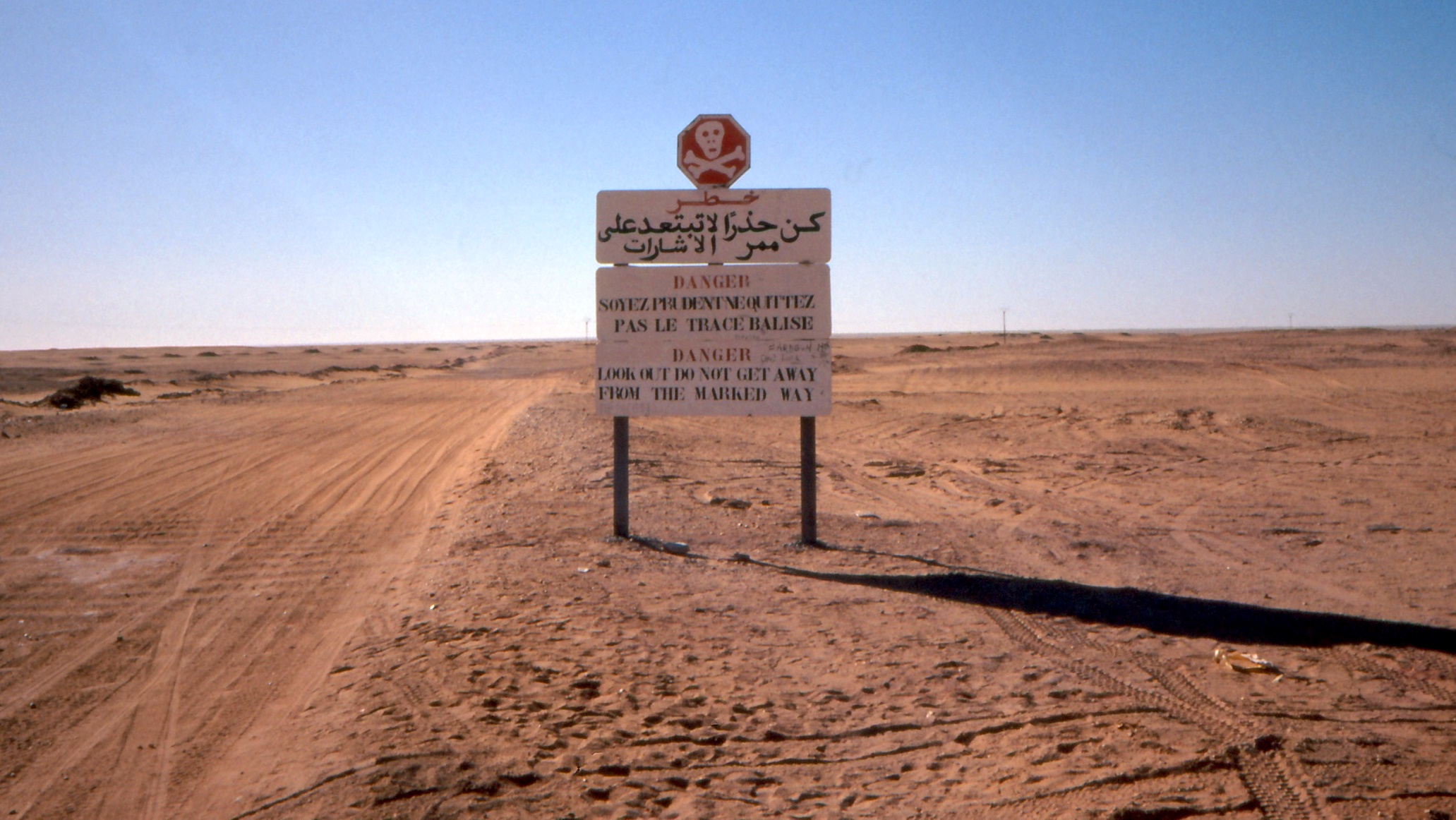
- Tanezrouft danger sign
- Country: Algeria and Mali
- Elevation: 310 m (1,020 ft)

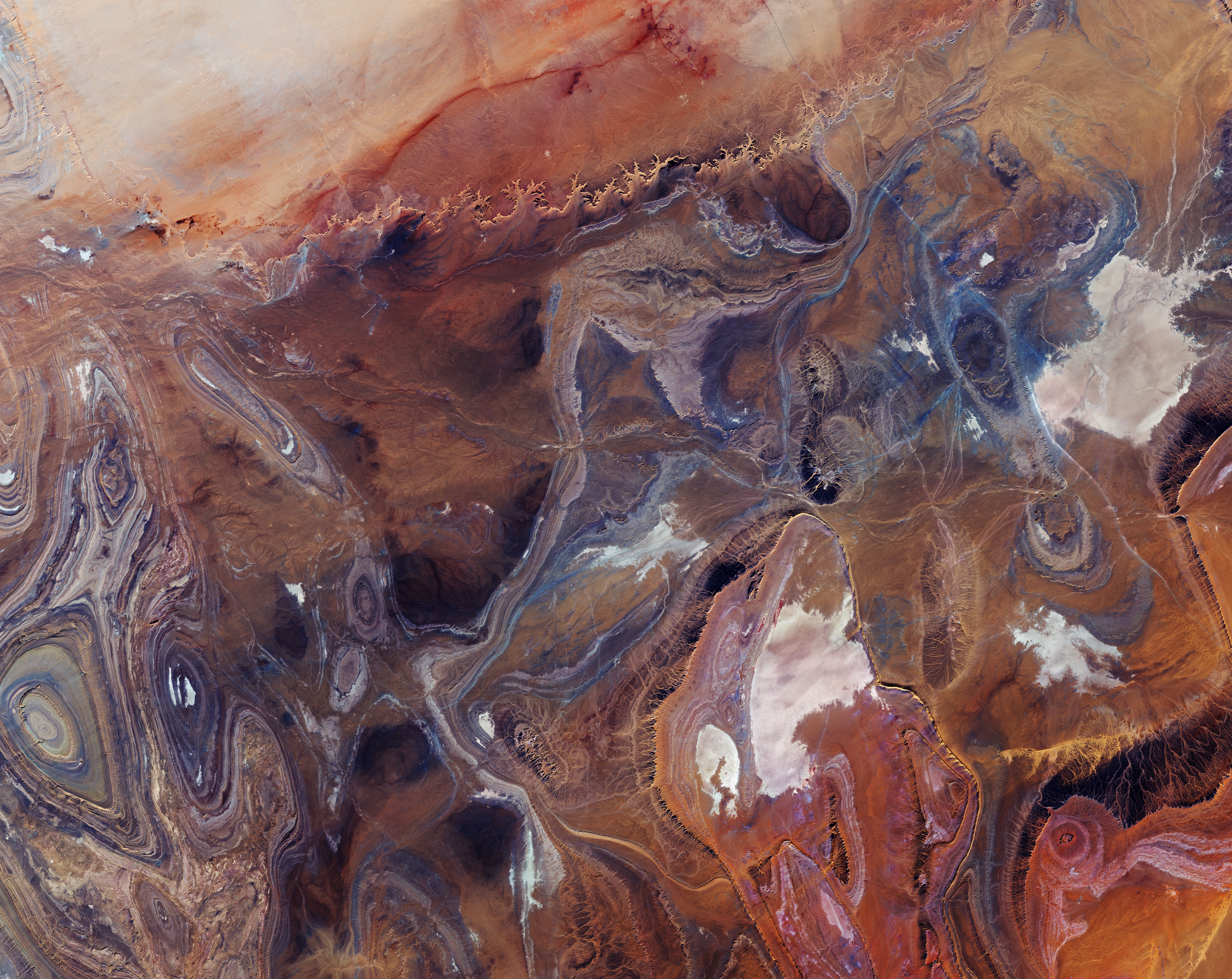
Tanezrouft

The Tanezrouft (Arabic: تنزروفت) is a natural region located along the borders of Algeria and Mali, west of the Hoggar Mountains. Along with the Libyan Desert it is one of the most desolate and most arid parts of the Sahara Desert. This area has no permanent residents and is known for its soaring temperatures and scarce access to crucial resources: water and food. Due to this, it is commonly referred to as the "land of terror". The name means ‘waterless desert’ in Tamashek.

Although largely without natural landmarks, a significant planetary intersection point between the Greenwich Meridian and the Tropic of Cancer is located in the Algerian part of the region.

== Geographic features ==
The Tanezrouft is a vast barren plain extending to the west of the Adrar Ahnet, southeast of the Erg Chech sand sea, and north of the Adrar des Ifoghas hills in northern Mali.

Almost entirely located in Algeria, the Tanezrouft is notoriously flat, featureless and without wells. In 1922 the firm gravel plain enabled the first crossing of the Sahara by motor vehicle. The terrain shows stark evidence of long-ago water erosion when the Sahara Desert's climate was much wetter, but the present annual rainfall is much less than 20 mm. Today the terrain is being shaped by wind erosion, which occurs much faster than in other areas, since there is little or no vegetation to hold the surface in place. The area is known for aridity and extreme heat, and temperatures in summer can easily reach 52 °C (125.6 °F).

Because it is so arid, bleak and flat, the Tanezrouft was never the site of human occupation. In the Tuareg languages its name means "Land of Thirst". Since perhaps 500 BC a desolate trade route has connected the Niger River with the Tidikelt, Touat and the Hoggar in Algeria. It is now spanned north–south by a trans-Saharan route from Béchar in Algeria via Reggane to Tessalit and Gao in Mali. During the colonial era Poste Maurice Cortier (also known as Bidon V, or 'oil drum 5') was a desolate refueling station along this route, 250 kilometres (or five oil drum markers) north of Tessalit. Because of its desolation, in the early 1960s the French tested atomic bombs, south of Reggane.

== Fauna ==
In the Niger portion of Tanezrouft, populations of the endangered painted hunting dog were previously viable west of the Hoggar Mountains, but now the painted hunting dog is thought to be extinct in all of Niger.

== Eponym ==
In 2018, the asteroid 26871 Tanezrouft was named after the Tanezrouft Basin.
