= Compagnie générale transsaharienne =

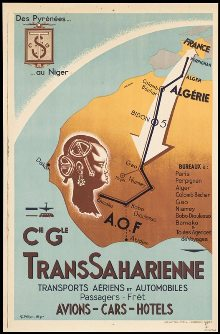
- Industry: Transport
- Founded: 1923
- Defunct: June 1950
- Area served: Sahara
- Key people: Gaston Gradis, Georges Estienne

The Compagnie générale transsaharienne (CGT) was a French company founded in 1923 that provided road and air transport in the French colonial territories that covered most of the Sahara. It was acquired by a rival in June 1950.

== Foundation ==
The Compagnie Générale Transsaharienne (CGT) was founded on 23 May 1923. The founder was Gaston Gradis, president of the Nieuport-Astra airplane construction company and son-in-law of Henri Deutsch de la Meurthe, who had founded the first French airline, the Compagnie générale transaérienne. The retired General Jean Baptiste Eugène Estienne, who had designed and built tanks during the war, was made president of the company. The purpose of the company was to "study, establish and exploit land and air communications between the various territories of the African continent, particularly between Algeria and Niger." The company planned to provide land and air transport, including infrastructure and operations, for tourism and for topographic reconnaissance of the Mediterranean-Niger railroad project.

== Exploratory expeditions ==
French Sahara showing some of the first locations reached by trans-Saharan automobile

The company began with two exploratory voyages at the end of 1923 and the start of 1924. The first mission was led by lieutenant Georges Estienne, son of General Estienne, with his brother René and lieutenant Hubel, accompanied by four legionnaires and four Citroën mechanics. It travelled from Béni Ounif to Adrar, Algeria, and onward to Tessalit, then returned to Colomb-Béchar. Four Citroën cars with Kégresse tracks towed a Nieuport-Delage aircraft with folding wings covered by a huge white tarpaulin. The mission left Adrar on 17 November 1923, reached Tessalit on 30 November, and returned to Adrar on 13 December, having mapped a shorter route than those known before, over excellent terrain.

A second exploratory expedition left Colomb-Béchar at midnight on 25 January 1924, headed by Gaston Gradis, with three large six-wheel Renault cars with double tires. Gradis was accompanied by the Estienne brothers, M. Schwob, an engineer from Renault, and three mechanics. A rival Citroën expedition had left a day before, and the press made great play of the competition, which Gradis thought obscured the important goal of establishing a trans-Saharan route. After reaching Adrar the expedition left for the south in two vehicles, following the tracks of the November reconnaissance expedition, which were still visible. The six-wheel cars proved faster than the Citroën caterpillars. This expedition reached Gao, on the Niger River, and returned to Béchar on 1 March 1924. Gradis was optimistic about the potential for aerial travel along this route.

Another expedition left Colomb-Béchar on 15 November 1924 in three six-wheel Renaults headed by Gaston Gradis. Gradis was accompanied by the journalist Henri de Kérillis, and Marshal Louis Franchet d'Espèrey was accompanied by commandant Ihler. The Estienne brothers again joined the expedition. The other members were three Renault mechanics and three legionnaires. The expedition reached Savé in Dahomey on 3 December 1924 after a journey of 3,600 kilometres (2,200 mi). The expedition leaders took the train south, and reached Porto-Novo on the Atlantic on 14 December 1924. They then returned to Europe by boat, while the Estienne brothers raced back from Savé to Colomb Bechar in six days, setting a new record for long-distance speed in Africa.

The trans-Saharan expedition was acclaimed as a great success, but Georges Estienne was not satisfied due to the huge resources that had been required. The two brothers returned to improve the track. In February 1926 they marked out the route from Adrar so vehicles could find their way in sands storms and heat haze. At each kilometer on the 50 kilometres (31 mi) route they placed a numbered barrel with a water reserve. This was the famous "Bidon V" route.

== Operations ==
Georges Estienne became head of the CGT. In April 1926 he and René Estienne created a "sleeping car", a moving hotel that made it possible to cross the Tanezrouft in comfort. To publicize the practicality of the crossing, in 1927 Georges traveled alone from Oran to Niamey in five days as part of an eleven-day journey from Paris to Fort-Lamy. On 18 May 1927 René was killed when a convoy of trucks he was in was attacked by robbers on the road from Tafilalt. Georges continued without his brother, and pushed the track through to Gao. The route soon became popular for sporting expeditions.

In the winter of 1927–28 the CGT began running a regular service from Colomb-Béchar to Gao using Renault automobiles. In 1928 Georges Estienne resigned from the army to dedicate himself to the CGT. The local French forces, who already had difficulty maintaining order in the desert, had to cope with an influx of tourists who were completely unfamiliar with the conditions, although the cost and duration of the trips kept numbers low. The administration was forced to reclassify Timbuktu and Gao in 1931 so they would qualify for funds allocated to tourism and business development. Hotels along the route in Reggane, Gao and Niamey were operated by the Compagnie Générale Transatlantique.

In 1933 Georges Estienne resigned from the CGT and became involved in opening the oasis route through the Hoggar Mountains. He was made head of the Société Algérienne des Transports Tropicaux (SATT). The CGT took the western route, while its competitor the SATT took the eastern route Algiers – Ouargla – Tamanrasset – Agadès – Zinder – Kano.

At the end of October 1938 the army contracted with the CGT to provide trucks and cars for desert crossing. This was not a very effective arrangement, and service could not be provided during the rainy season. The tracks were also not capable of handling the load of repeated convoys, despite deployment of convict labor for repairs. In 1939–40 the CGT transported 4,000 soldiers in 16 convoys of 250 men, carried in seven trucks, from Gao to Bechar. The journey took at least ten days. In March 1942 CGT made arrangements with Mer Niger for maintenance of the military and civilian bases on the route. The CGT, then based in Paris, provided weekly service using Renault trucks and cars from Bechar to Gao.

Both the CGT and the SATT added air service after World War II (1939–45). CGT provided air transport for passengers and freight. In October 1946 plans were made to create an air network centered on Niamey. The plan was approved on 18 May 1947. The company was based in Algiers, with Maurice Bonhomme as president and Pierre Puyt as Director of African operations. In August 1947 it opened five routes with four Junkers Ju 52 aircraft. The main route was Algiers – Mascara – Aïn Séfra – Colomb Béchar – Adrar – Gao – Niamey – Bobo Dioulasso – Bamako, with flights twice a month. The airline hoped to link up to Brazzaville. Publicity at the time advertised "Rapid transport from the Pyrenees to the Niger".

After a series of accidents, in 1948 the airline returned the Ju 52 planes to the army and used a Bristol 170 and two Douglas DC-3 machines on loan from the Compagnie Air Transport. This belonged to the same group as the Compagnie générale transatlantique, with which the CGT merged in June 1950.

== Sources ==
- Bloom, Peter J. (2008). French Colonial Documentary: Mythologies of Humanitarianism. U of Minnesota Press. ISBN 978-0-8166-4628-9.
- Boilley, Pierre (2013). Les Touaregs Kel Adagh: Dépendances et Révoltes: Du Soudan Français Au Mali Contemporain. KARTHALA Editions. ISBN 978-2-8111-0635-5.
- Bourgin, Michel (2011). Chroniques touarègues. L'Harmattan. p. 318. ISBN 978-2-296-56473-2.
- Ferry, Vital (2005). Ciels impériaux africains, 1911-1940: les pionniers belges et français. Le gerfaut. ISBN 978-2-914622-58-5.
- Ferry, Vital (2006). Du trimoteur au quadrijet: le transport aérien en Afrique noire francophone, 1940-1961. Le gerfaut. ISBN 978-2-35191-007-8.
- Gastines, Christian de (2013). "1909 à 1927 – De la Manche au Sahara avec des hommes d'action aux commandes".
- Goinard, Odette (2014). "Georges Estienne" (in French).
- Grégoire, Emmanuel (2010-03-01). Touaregs du Niger. Le destin d'un mythe (nouvelle édition). KARTHALA Editions. ISBN 978-2-8111-3261-3.
- Joly, Vincent (2006-12-01). Le Soudan français de 1939 à 1945. Une colonie dans la guerre. KARTHALA Editions. ISBN 978-2-8111-4076-2.
- Mondet, Arlette Estienne (2011-01-01). Le général J.B.E Estienne – père des chars: Des chenilles et des ailes. Editions L'Harmattan. ISBN 978-2-296-44757-8.
- Scranton, Philip; Davidson, Janet F. (2007). The Business of Tourism: Place, Faith, And History. University of Pennsylvania Press. ISBN 978-0-8122-3968-3.
