= Poste Maurice Cortier =

French military post in Algeria

Poste Maurice Cortier Bidon V
- Location of Poste Maurice Cortier in Algeria
- Country: Algeria
- Province: Bordj Badji Mokhtar

Poste Maurice Cortier was a desert halt in the Tanezrouft region of the Sahara Desert in southern Algeria, along the way from Algiers to French Sudan on the route from Reggane, Algeria to Gao, Mali.

The post was officially named after French soldier and explorer Maurice Cortier, who was part of the Arnaud-Cortier Mission to Timiaouine in 1907. It was popularly known as Bidon V because its sign board was an empty gas-can with the Roman numeral 5 painted upon it; and "bidon" is French for "gas-can".

== History ==
In the 1920s, the Compagnie Générale Transsaharienne (CGT) launched expeditions into the Sahara in order to develop efficient car and plane routes across French Africa, led by Georges Estienne and his brother René. Two expeditions passed through the Tanezrouft; the first such expedition was the First Gradis Expedition in 1923, and the second was in 1926. During these expeditions, waypoints consisting of gas cans and water stops were established every 50 km (31 mi) or 100 km (62 mi); Bidon V was the fifth of these stops.

By 1930, as the crossing of the Tanezrouft could not be done in a single stage, the French government of Algeria decided to convert Bidon V into a proper camp with a radio. In November of that year, a Shell gas station was installed at Bidon V, and in January 1934, a refuelling stop for airplanes was added, both times under the auspices of the Compagnie Générale Transsaharienne. In the intervening time, the post and its lone guardian became famous for trans-Sahara tourism.

During the Second World War, a well was drilled at the post by the French Engineering Corps; water was struck on January 15, 1942, confirming the existence of an aquifer underneath the area. Efforts began shortly after to plant crops and produce castor oil, among other things.

In 1951, road transport routes resumed through the Tanezrouft, and the CGT resumed long-distance tourism journeys through Bidon V.
