= Gaston Gradis =

French businessman and explorer (1889–1968)

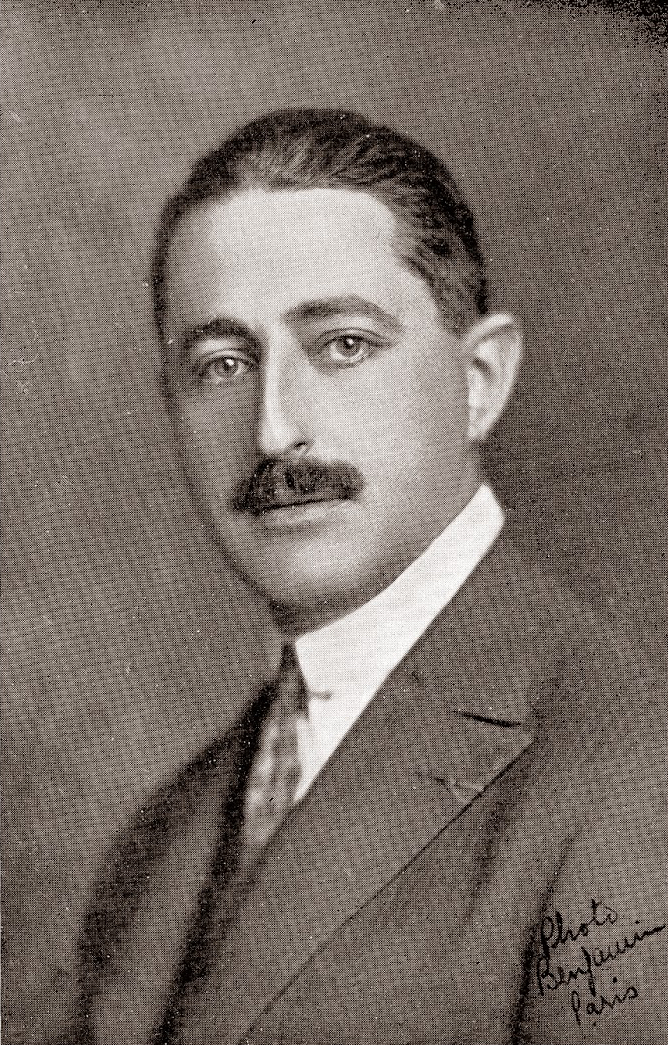
- Gaston Gradis
- Born: 7 May 1889; Paris, France
- Died: 15 January 1968 (aged 78); Rabat, Morocco
- Occupation: Businessman
- Known for: 1924 Sahara crossing by car

Gaston Gradis (7 May 1889 – 15 January 1968) was a French businessman and explorer. He came from a wealthy family of Bordeaux shipowners. After serving as an artillery captain in World War I, he became the head of various transport and trading businesses. He is known for having undertaken the first crossing of the Sahara by automobile in 1924.

== Early years ==
Gaston Gradis was born in Paris on 7 May 1889, from an old family of Bordeaux shipowners. His family, which was of Portuguese-Jewish descent, had been granted the right to obtain property in the colonies by Louis XVI. His parents were Raoul Gradis (1861–1943) and Suzanne Fould. His grandfather, Henri Gradis (1823–1905) was a grandson of Laure Sarah Rodrigues-Henriques. He was a nephew of Georges Schwob d'Héricourt (1864–1942) and cousin of Germaine de Rothschild (1884–975), wife of Édouard Alphonse James de Rothschild (1868–1949).

Gradis joined the École Polytechnique in 1910. In 1911 he volunteered for the army, joining the Artillery school in the same year. During World War I (1914–1918) he was made a lieutenant in 1914 and an artillery captain in 1917. For his actions in the war he was made a Knight of the Legion of Honour and received the Croix de Guerre and five citations. Gradis became president of Nieuport, the Compagnie générale transsaharienne and the Brasseries du Maroc. He was a director of Société Française pour le Commerce avec l'Outre-mer, of Maurel & Prom and other companies.

In 1918 Gradis married Georgette Deutsch de la Meurthe. Her father, Henri Deutsch de la Meurthe, was the first oil refiner in France first at Nantes and then at Saint-Loubès, with Pétrole Jupiter. Their son, Henri Gradis (born 1920), a corporate director, married Bernadette Servan-Schreiber, sister of Jean-Jacques Servan-Schreiber. His second wife was the daughter of General Jean-Léonard Koechlin.

== Sahara crossing ==
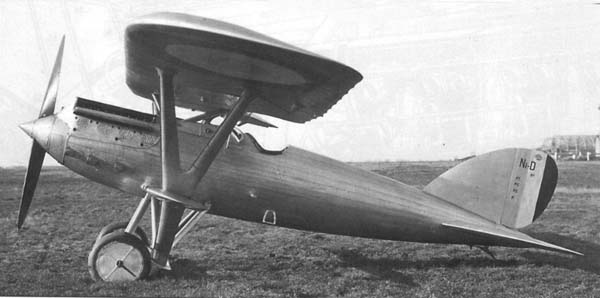
Nieuport-Delage aircraft. A folding-wing version was taken on the first exploratory journey.

Gradis directed the first expedition to cross the Sahara from north to south by car. For this purpose, on 23 May 1923 he founded the Compagnie générale transsaharienne (CGT). The retired General Jean Baptiste Eugène Estienne, who had designed and built tanks during the war, was made president of the company. The purpose of the company was to "study, establish and exploit land and air communications between the various territories of the African continent, particularly between Algeria and Niger." An exploratory mission was sent under Georges Estienne, son of General Estienne, with his brother René and lieutenant Hubel, accompanied by four legionnaires and four Citroën mechanics. The mission left Adrar on 17 November 1923, reached Tessalit on 30 November, and returned to Adrar on 13 December, having mapped a shorter route than those known before, over excellent terrain.

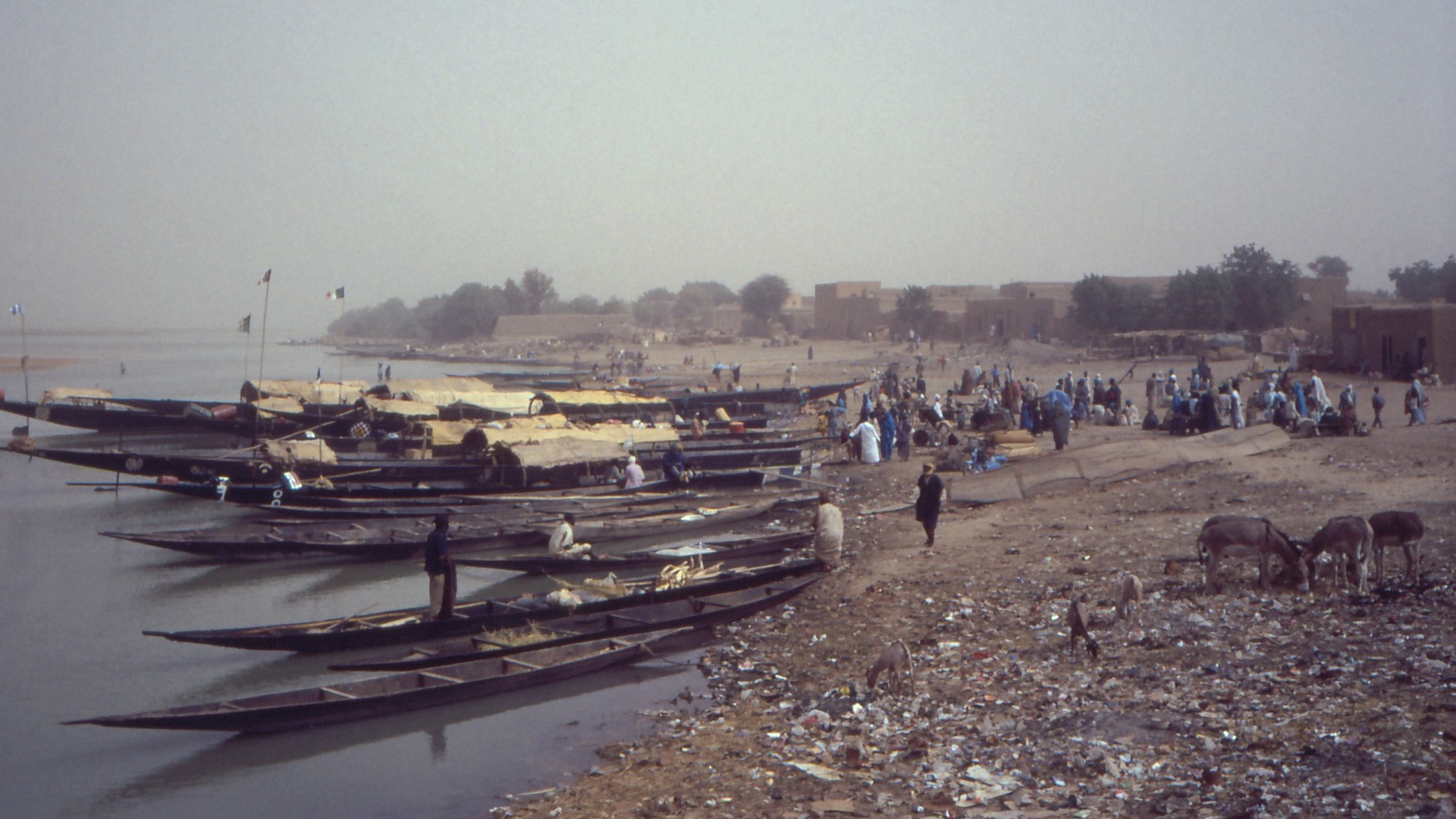
Gao on the Niger River

Gaston Gradis headed a second exploratory expedition that left Colomb-Béchar at midnight on 25 January 1924 with three large six-wheel Renault cars with double tires. Gradis was accompanied by the Estienne brothers, M. Schwob, an engineer from Renault, and three mechanics. A rival Citroën expedition had left a day before, and the press made great play of the competition, which Gradis thought obscured the important goal of establishing a trans-Saharan route. After reaching Adrar the expedition left for the south in two vehicles, following the tracks of the November reconnaissance expedition, which were still visible. The six-wheel cars proved faster than the Citroën caterpillars. This expedition reached Gao, on the Niger River, and returned to Béchar on 1 March 1924. Gradis was optimistic about the potential for aerial travel along this route.

The second Gradis expedition left Colomb-Béchar on 15 November 1924 in three six-wheel Renaults. Gradis was accompanied by the journalist Henri de Kérillis, and Marshal Louis Franchet d'Espèrey was accompanied by commandant Ihler. The Estienne brothers again joined the expedition. The other members were three Renault mechanics and three legionnaires. The expedition reached Savé in Dahomey on 3 December 1924 after a journey of 3,600 kilometres (2,200 mi). The expedition leaders took the train south, and reached Porto-Novo on the Atlantic on 14 December 1924. They then returned to Europe by boat, while the Estienne brothers raced back from Savé to Colomb Bechar in six days, setting a new record for long-distance speed in Africa.

== Later years ==
In the winter of 1927/1928 the CGT began running a regular service from Colomb-Béchar to Gao using Renault automobiles. The French security forces struggled to provide adequate protection to the Saharan tourists, whose numbers grew when the service was made weekly. Hotels along the route in Reggane, Gao and Niamey were operated by the Compagnie Générale Transatlantique. Timbuktu and Gao received additional funds from the government in recognition of their commercial and tourist potential.

Gaston Gradis settled in Rabat, where he established various businesses, including Conserveries Nora in Meknes, growing roses for their oils to be used in perfume, and growing citrus crops for manufacture of soft drinks. He also made wine from his vineyards in the domaine de Margarance in Saint-Louis-de-Montferrand. During World War II (1939–1945), after the defeat of France in 1940 the Vichy laws on the status of Jews confiscated businesses owned by Jews. Gaston Gradis was one of only three business leaders who were exempted from this law on the basis of exceptional services to the French state, the other two being Raymond Berr and Pierre Lyon. However, Gradis disappeared from view in 1943. He died in Rabat on 15 January 1968, and was buried in the family vault at Lormont.

== Bibliography ==
- Gradis, Gaston (1923). Les Ballons dirigeables. R. Hermieu.
- Gradis, Gaston (1924). A la recherche du Grand-Axe. Contribution aux études transsahariennes. Avec 42 photographies et 5 cartes. impr.-libr.-éditeurs Plon-Nourrit et Cie, 8, rue Garancière.

== Sources ==
- Altmann, Simon; Ortiz, Eduardo L. (17 October 2006). Mathematics and Social Utopias in France: Olinde Rodrigues and His Times. American Mathematical Soc. ISBN 978-0-8218-4253-9.
- Berr, Hélène (11 November 2008). The Journal of Hélčne Berr. Weinstein Books. ISBN 978-1-60286-069-8.
- Bloom, Peter J. (2008). French Colonial Documentary: Mythologies of Humanitarianism. U of Minnesota Press. ISBN 978-0-8166-4628-9.
- Bourgin, Michel (2011). Chroniques touarègues. L'Harmattan. p. 318. ISBN 978-2-296-56473-2.
- Cadish (16 April 2013). "Gaston Gradis sur la piste des éléphants". Sud Ouest.
- Ferry, Vital (2005). Ciels impériaux africains 1911–1940: Les pionniers belges et français. Le gerfaut. ISBN 978-2-914622-58-5.
- Gastines, Christian de (2013). "1909 à 1927 – De la Manche au Sahara avec des hommes d'action aux commandes".
- Mondet, Arlette Estienne (1 January 2011). Le général J.B.E Estienne – père des chars: Des chenilles et des ailes. Editions L'Harmattan. ISBN 978-2-296-44757-8.
- Rochebrune, Renaud de; Hazera, Jean-Claude (21 March 2013). Patrons sous l'Occupation (Les). Odile Jacob. ISBN 978-2-7381-2938-3.
- Scranton, Philip; Davidson, Janet F. (2007). The Business of Tourism: Place, Faith, And History. University of Pennsylvania Press. ISBN 978-0-8122-3968-3.
