= Georges Estienne =

French aviator, explorer and businessman

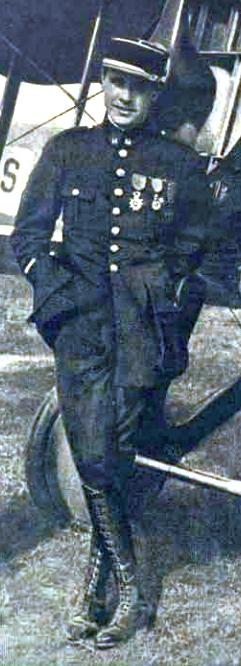
- Georges Estienne during World War I
- Born: 18 April 1896; Nice, France
- Died: 25 January 1969 (aged 72); Monte Carlo
- Occupations: Aviator, explorer, businessman
- Known for: Trans-Saharan routes

Georges Estienne (18 April 1896 – 25 January 1969) was a French aviator, explorer and businessman. He mapped and commercially exploited the longest automobile route in the world, linking the Mediterranean to the Niger, Chad and Congo. His company ran a network of automobile transport lines across the Sahara, and later provided air service between many of the French colonies in Africa. The demand from tourists collapsed with the Algerian War (1954–62), and eventually Estienne's companies were taken over by the government of independent Algeria.

== Early years ==
Georges Estienne's family originated in Lorraine. He was the third son of General Jean Baptiste Eugène Estienne, polytechnician, who was known for developing armored vehicles and the tank. The four Estienne boys were brought up with military discipline. After the outbreak of World War I (1914–18), in September 1914 Georges enlisted at the age of eighteen. He served with the fourth battalion of Chasseurs Alpins in the campaigns in Belgium, the Somme and the Vogues. He asked to be transferred to aviation, and quickly distinguished himself as a specialist in long-range reconnaissance. By the age of twenty-one he had earned seven citations, and had been awarded the military medal and the Legion of Honour.

== Early Sahara crossings ==
After the war, influenced by his father, Georges Estienne became attracted to the Sahara. At the time the Sahara was mostly within the French colonial empire, and had not yet been fully explored by Europeans. The main means of travel was by camel in caravans.

Gaston Gradis organised the first expedition to cross the Sahara from north to south by car. For this purpose, on 23 May 1923 he founded the Compagnie Générale Transsaharienne (CGT). The retired General Jean Baptiste Eugène Estienne was made president of the company. The company aimed to "study, establish and exploit land and air communications between the various territories of the African continent, particularly between Algeria and Niger." It was decided to send a reconnaissance under lieutenant Georges Estienne as far as Tessalit to study the route, and if results were favorable to send a second led by Gaston Gradis to the Niger River.

The first expedition was led by Georges Estienne, with his brother René and lieutenant Hubel, accompanied by four legionnaires and four Citroën mechanics. They travelled from Béni Ounif to Adrar, Algeria, and onward to Tessalit, then returned to Colomb-Béchar. Four Citroën cars with Kégresse tracks towed a Nieuport-Delage aircraft with folding wings covered by a huge white tarpaulin. The mission left Adrar on 17 November 1923, reached Tessalit on 30 November, and returned to Adrar on 13 December, having mapped a shorter route than those known before, over excellent terrain.

A second exploratory expedition left Colomb-Béchar at midnight on 25 January 1924, headed by Gaston Gradis, with three large six-wheel Renault cars with double tires. Gradis was accompanied by the Estienne brothers, M. Schwob, an engineer from Renault, and three mechanics. After reaching Adrar the expedition left for the south in two vehicles, following the tracks of the November reconnaissance expedition, which were still visible. The six-wheel cars proved faster than the Citroën caterpillars. This expedition reached Gao, on the Niger River, and returned to Béchar on 1 March 1924. Gradis was optimistic about the potential for aerial travel along this route.

The second Gradis expedition left Colomb-Béchar on 15 November 1924 in three six-wheel Renaults. Gradis was accompanied by the journalist Henri de Kérillis, and Marshal Louis Franchet d'Espèrey was accompanied by commandant Ihler. The Estienne brothers again joined the expedition. The other members were three Renault mechanics and three legionnaires. The expedition reached Savé in Dahomey on 3 December 1924 after a journey of 3,600 kilometres (2,200 mi). The expedition leaders took the train south, and reached Porto-Novo on the Atlantic on 14 December 1924. They then returned to Europe by boat, while the Estienne brothers raced back from Savé to Colomb Bechar in six days, setting a new record for long-distance speed in Africa.

== Trans-Saharan transport ==
French Sahara showing some of the first locations reached by trans-Saharan automobile

The trans-Saharan expedition was acclaimed as a great success, but Georges Estienne was not satisfied due to the huge resources that had been required. The two brothers returned to improve the track. In February 1926 they marked out the route from Adrar so vehicles could find their way in sands storms and heat haze. At each kilometer on the 50 kilometres (31 mi) route they placed a numbered barrel with a water reserve. This was the famous "Bidon V" route.

Georges Estienne became head of the CGT. In April 1926 he and René Estienne created a "sleeping car", a moving hotel that made it possible to cross the Tanezrouft in comfort. To publicize the practicality of the crossing, in 1927 Georges traveled alone from Oran to Niamey in five days as part of an eleven-day journey from Paris to Fort-Lamy. On 18 May 1927 René was killed when a convoy of trucks he was in was attacked by robbers on the road from Tafilalt. Georges continued without his brother, and pushed the track through to Gao. The route soon became popular for sporting expeditions.

Georges Estienne married in 1927, and had two sons and two daughters. The family settled in the Nice area. In 1928 he resigned from the army to dedicate himself to the CGT. In 1933 he resigned from the CGT and became involved in opening the oasis route through the Hoggar Mountains. He was made head of the Société Algérienne des Transports Tropicaux (SATT). He and his brother Jean were major shareholders of the SATT. The Hoggar route made it possible to travel from Algiers to Kano in eleven days. In 1934 the line was extended to Fort Lamy. This was the longest route in the world with regular automobile transport. Estienne established and operated trans-Saharan lines for thirty-eight years from his office in Algiers. He built workshops at Fort-de-l'Eau, Algiers to maintain his rolling stock.

During World War II (1939–45) SATT continued its automobile service. After the allies landed in French North Africa the company was allowed to use whatever aircraft it had, which was in effect nothing. In 1945 its automobile fleet had 150 vehicles and with the acquisition of aircraft was able to obtain enough revenue to create the subsidiary Aéro-Africaine with a capital of 10 million. The airline was headed by Georges Estienne. From 11 May 1946 the airline was authorized to provide regular transport from Algiers to fifteen locations among the southern oases and the Hoggar. On 29 October 1946 it obtained permission for an extension to Nice, taking tourists from there via Algiers to the Hoggar.

After 1946 SATT expanded to become the Société Africaine des Transports Tropicaux, with expanding tourist operations. By 1949 the air network was serving many of the French African colonies from Bamako to Bangui from its hub at Tamanrasset in the Hoggar. Planes in the early days included NC.702 Martinets, De Havilland Dragon Rapides, Douglas DC-3s, Lockheed L-18s and Lockheed C-60s. When the Algerian War began in 1954 tourism disappeared. The Aéroafricaine lines were taken over by Air Algérie. In 1963 the Algerian state took over the companies without compensation. Estienne died in 1969.

== Publications ==
- Georges Estienne (1937). Naissance de "Bidon V" (PDF) (in French). Paris: Publications du Comité de l'Afrique française.

== Sources ==
- Bloom, Peter J. (2008). French Colonial Documentary: Mythologies of Humanitarianism. U of Minnesota Press. ISBN 978-0-8166-4628-9.
- Bourgin, Michel (2011). Chroniques touarègues. L'Harmattan. p. 318. ISBN 978-2-296-56473-2.
- Cadish (2013-04-16). "Gaston Gradis sur la piste des éléphants". Sud Ouest.
- Ferry, Vital (2005). Ciels impériaux africains 1911–1940: Les pionniers belges et français. Le gerfaut. ISBN 978-2-914622-58-5.
- Ferry, Vital (2006). Du trimoteur au quadrijet: le transport aérien en Afrique noire francophone, 1940-1961. Le gerfaut. ISBN 978-2-35191-007-8.
- Gastines, Christian de (2013). "1909 à 1927 – De la Manche au Sahara avec des hommes d'action aux commandes".
- Goinard, Odette (2014). "Georges Estienne" (in French).
- Mondet, Arlette Estienne (2011-01-01). Le général J.B.E Estienne – père des chars: Des chenilles et des ailes. Editions L'Harmattan. ISBN 978-2-296-44757-8.
- Scranton, Philip; Davidson, Janet F. (2007). The Business of Tourism: Place, Faith, And History. University of Pennsylvania Press. ISBN 978-0-8122-3968-3.
