= Véronique Cortier =

French mathematician and computer scientist

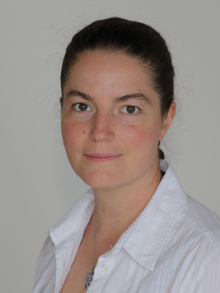
Véronique Cortier in Nancy (France) in 2017

Véronique Cortier is a French mathematician and computer scientist specializing in cryptography. Her research has applied mathematical logic in the formal verification of cryptographic protocols, and has included the development of secure electronic voting systems. She has also contributed to the public dissemination of knowledge about cryptography through a sequence of posts on the binaire blog of Le Monde. She is a director of research with CNRS, associated with the Laboratoire Lorrain de Recherche en Informatique et ses Applications (LORIA) at the University of Lorraine in Nancy.

== Education and career ==
Cortier studied mathematics and computer science at the École normale supérieure de Cachan from 1997 until 2001, earning a master's degree and completing her agrégation. She remained at Cachan for her doctoral studies, completing a Ph.D. in 2003 with the dissertation Automatic Verification of Cryptographic Protocols supervised by Hubert Comon. She joined the French Centre national de la recherche scientifique (CNRS) in 2003, completed a habilitation in 2009, and became a director of research with CNRS in 2010.

== Recognition ==
Cortier was the 2003 winner of the Gilles Kahn Prize of the Société informatique de France for the best French dissertation in computer science. She also won a second dissertation prize, from Le Monde. In 2015 she became the second woman to win the INRIA and French Academy of Sciences Young Researcher Award for her work on Belenios, a secure electronic voting system. In 2022 she won the CNRS Silver Medal.
