= Henri Gradis =

French businessman and historian

Moïse Henri Gradis
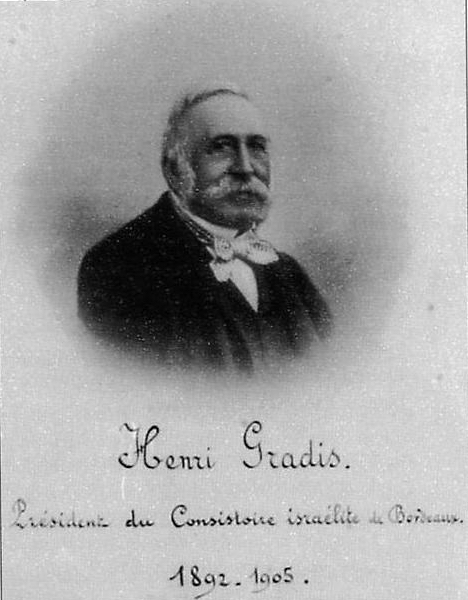
- Henri Gradis, president of the Consistoire israelite de Bordeaux 1892-1905
- Born: 30 July 1823; Bordeaux, France
- Died: 23 January 1905 (aged 81); Paris, France
- Occupations: Businessman and historian
- Known for: Histoire de Bordeaux

Moïse Henri Gradis (30 July 1823 – 23 January 1905) was a French businessman and historian.

== Life ==
Moïse Henri Gradis was born on 30 July 1823 in Bordeaux. He came from a family of prominent Portuguese-Jewish Bordeaux merchants who had flourished in the 18th century but were ruined by the French Revolution and the insurrections in Santo Domingo and Martinique. His parents were Benjamin Gradis (1789–1858) and Laure Sarah Rodrigues Henriquès (1803–46). In 1853 he married Claire Brandame (1835–1925). Their son was Raoul Gradis (1861–1943). Their daughter Emma Gradis married Georges Schwob d'Héricourt in 1889.

The Maison Gradis recovered, and by 1892 was selling sugar from several producers in Bordeaux, Nantes and Marseille. Henri Gradis was deputy mayor of Bordeaux in 1864 and 1876. He was also the author of a history of Bordeaux and several other literary works. His history of the 1848 revolution won praise for its accuracy and lack of bias. Moïse Henri Gradis died in Paris in 1905. He was succeeded at the Maison Gradis by his son Raoul.

== Publications ==
- Measure for Measure, by William Shakespeare (translation, 1847)
- Réflexions sur le christianisme, suivies d’une lettre à un jeune Israélite (1847-1850)
- Histoire de la guerre de 1870 (1870)
- Notes sur la guerre de 1870 et sur la Commune (1872)
- Histoire de la révolution de 1848
- Judaïsme et christianisme (1874)
- Notice sur la Famille Gradis et sur la Maison Gradis et Fils de Bordeaux (1875)
- Introduction à l'histoire du peuple d'Israël; judaïsme et christianisme (1876)
- Polyxène, drame antique en 4 actes et en vers (1881)
- Jérusalem, drame en 5 actes et en vers (1883)
- Histoire de Bordeaux. Bordeaux: Féret. 1901. p. 459. Archived from the original on 2015-12-22.
- Le peuple d'Israël (Paris, 1891)

== Sources ==
- "Georges Schwob d'Héricourt(1864-1942)" (PDF). Les entreprises coloniales françaises. 2014-09-30. Archived from the original (PDF) on 2016-03-04.
- "GRADIS". Jewish Encyclopedia. 1906.
- "Maison GRADIS à Bordeaux" (PDF). Archives Nationales.
- "Moïse Henri GRADIS". Geneanet.
- Schoenberg, Randy (2012-06-21). "Raoul Gradis". Geni.
- "SFCO (Ancienne Maison Gradis)". Les Hénokiens.
- The Nation. J.H. Richards & Company. 1873. p. 287.
