= Raoul Gradis =

French painter

- Gradis c. 1940
- Born: David Alexandre Raoul Gradis; 15 June 1861; Bordeaux, France
- Died: 18 June 1943 (aged 82)
- Occupations: Painter, composer and shipowner

Raoul Gradis (15 June 1861 – 18 June 1943) was a French painter, composer and shipowner.

== Origins ==
Raoul Gradis was the son of Moïse Henri Gradis (1823–1905) and Hanna Claire (Brandame) Gradis (1835–1925). His family was Jewish, and had probably moved to Bordeaux from Portugal around 1495. From 1685 onward the Gradis family was a wealthy line of merchants and shipowners. They corresponded with all the main markets of Europe, and were prominent in trade between France and the Caribbean, Canada and the United States. From before the French Revolution the family was recognized as leaders of the French Jewish community. The family company David Gradis & fils traded in wines, spirits and fabrics. The Gradis house received important privileges, particularly in Martinique and Saint Domingo, in return for their services to the state. Raoul's father Henri Gradis, who was deputy mayor of Bordeaux, wrote a history of Bordeaux and several literary works.

== Early life ==
David Alexandre Raoul Gradis was born in Bordeaux on 15 June 1861. Raoul Gradis enlisted in the army in 1881, became a lieutenant in 1884, then was made captain in the 23rd territorial artillery regiment. He studied painting under Maxime Lalanne at the Ecole des Beaux-arts de Bordeaux, then under Ferdinand Humbert and Henri Gervex at the Ecole des Beaux-arts de Paris. He exhibited at the Salon des Amis des Arts from 1886, and was a member of the Salon. Gradis wrote several musical works including "Poem for piano and violin." He was an associate of the Society of French Artists and a member of the Philomathique Society of Bordeaux.

Raoul Gradis married Suzanne Fould in 1888. His wife was daughter of Paul Fould, Master of Requests of the French council of state, and Eve Mathilde de Günzburg. Her maternal grandfather was baron Joseph de Günzburg of St. Petersburg, Russia. Their children were Gaston Gradis (1889–1968), Marie-Louise Rachel Minna Blanchy (born 1894), who married Bernard Blanchy, and Jean Gradis (1900–1975). In 1899 his sister Esther Lucie Gabrielle Alice Emma Gradis (1866-1925) married Georges Julien Schwob d'Héricourt. Georges Schwob d'Héricourt became Raoul Gradis's business partner.

== Later career ==
Raoul Gradis succeeded his father as head of the Maison Gradis 1905, working with Georges Schwob d'Héricourt. During World War I (1914–18) "David Gradis et Fils" was responsible for ensuring France's entire supply of sugar. Raoul's sons Gaston and Jean Gradis served on the front as artillery officers. (Note: Gaston Gradis was a friend of Marshal Hubert Lyautey. He established many businesses in Morocco and Sub-Saharan Africa, and in 1924 led an expedition that was the first to cross the Sahara from north to south in wheeled automobiles.) In 1921 Raoul Gradis and Georges Schwob d'Héricourt changed the name of David Gradis et Fils to the Société française pour le commerce avec les colonies et l'étranger (SFCCE). (Note: In 1957 the SFCCE became the Société française pour le commerce avec l'Outre-mer (SFCO).) Georges Schwob d'Héricourt was president and Raul Gradis vice-president.

Gradis was president of the Union for Assistance of the 16th arrondissement of Paris and a member of the International Assistance Society, the Committee for Disaster Relief of Martinique, the committee of the Philanthropic Society and the General Council for extinction of begging in Bordeaux. He was made a Knight of the Legion of Honour and received the Ordre des Palmes Académiques, Royal Order of Cambodia and Order of Glory (Tunisia).

During the first part of World War II (1939–45) Raoul Gradis was president of the Jewish Consistory and head of the Jewish community in Bordeaux. On 6 June 1942 Raoul Gradis received his yellow star (badge of a Jew) from the police, but did not have to make it himself or to supply the textile used. In August 1942 Gradis asked for an exemption from the restrictions on movement imposed on Jews. He explained that at the age of 81, with a broken arm, he would like to go to the house in the country 15 kilometres (9.3 mi) from Bordeaux that his family had owned since 1680. He had respected the new decrees and had resigned from the vice-presidency of his business. His property had been seized and his home in Lormont had been requisitioned by the occupying forces. He noted that his son Gaston had been exempted from restrictions due to his service in the First World War. On 2 September 1943 SS Captain Doberschütz rejected the request.

Raoul Gradis died on 18 June 1943.

== Works ==
- Une expérience de philanthropie à la Martinique (1904)
- Poème pour piano et violon
- Partitions des quatuors n° 1 et n° 2 pour piano
- VIII pièces pour piano (1906)

== Sources ==
- Bergès, Michel (November 2010). "Approche qualitative de la tentative d'anéantissement de la communauté juive de Bordeaux (1940-1944)" (PDF). Jean-Marie Tremblay.
- Bunge Molina y Vedia, Carlos Federico (2013-01-16). "Esther Lucie Gabrielle Alice Emma Gradis". Geni.
- "GRADIS (Raoul)". Les peintres Bordelais.
- "Maison GRADIS à Bordeaux" (PDF). Archives Nationales.
- "Raoul GRADIS (1861-1943)". Hcotation. Archived from the original on 2014-10-21.
- Schoenberg, Randy (2012-06-21). "Raoul Gradis". Geni.
