= Ballistic shield =

Police and military anti-projectile shields

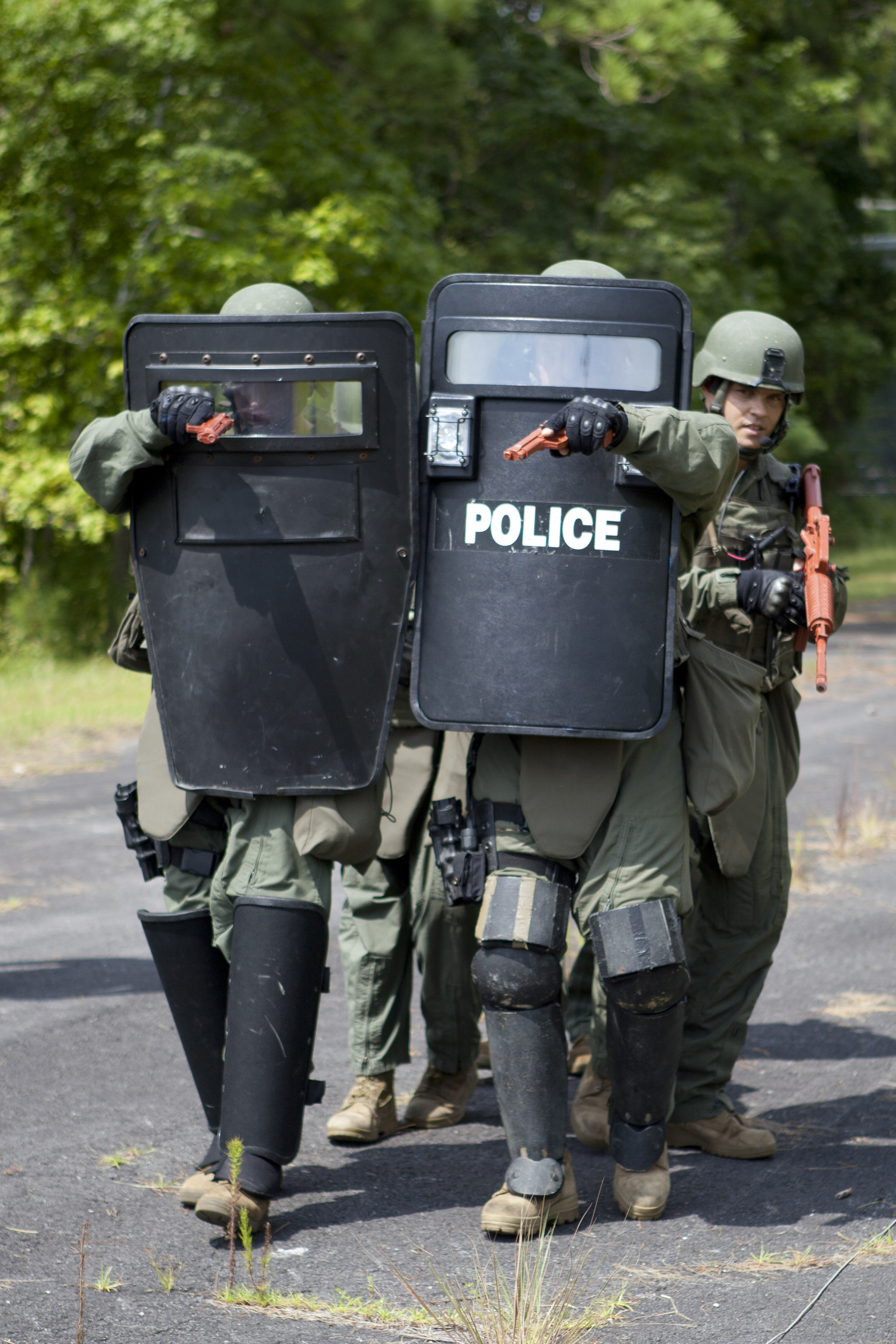
United States Marine Corps Military Police Special Reaction Team officers carrying ballistic shields during a training exercise

A ballistic shield, also called a tactical shield or bulletproof shield, is a protection device deployed by police, paramilitaries, and armed forces that are designed to stop or deflect bullets and other projectiles fired at their carrier. Ballistic shields also protect from less serious threats such as thrown items. Ballistic shields are similar to riot shields, but offer greater protection and are typically used by special units or in situations where riot shields would not offer adequate protection.

== Overview ==
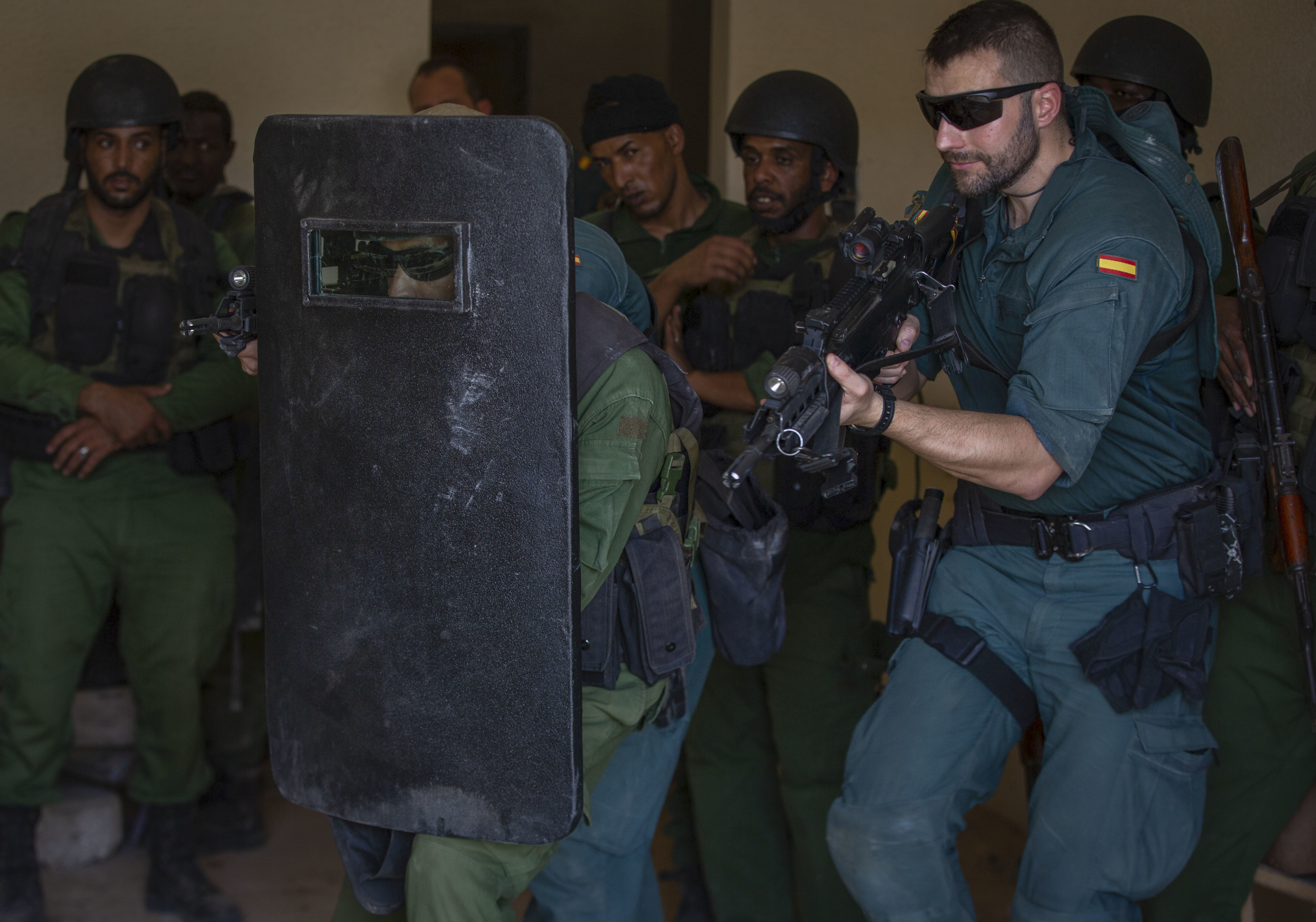
An Armed Forces of Mauritania soldier with a ballistic shield being covered by a Spanish Guardia Civil

Shields small enough to be carried by a single person may be termed "personal shields", and may be carried in police cars in the United States as standard equipment. Whether or not a shield is used will depend on both policy and the individual situation. It may be the policy of a police force to use shields only in defensive situations, such as establishing a perimeter and waiting for reinforcements, while others may permit their usage in offensive situations, such as high risk traffic stops or approaching a suspect deemed to be dangerous.

Recommended features of ballistic shields for police include a carrying system that allows it to be held long-term without fatigue, and the ability to both reload a handgun while holding the shield and also fire it accurately with one hand. The carriage of a ballistic shield in one hand will limit both the types of firearms that can be used with the other hand as well as certain methods of shooting.

== Composition ==
Ballistic shields are similar to body armor plates in their construction, and are typically made out of fibre-reinforced plastic composites derived from ultra-high-molecular-weight polyethylene or aramid. They may, like ceramic armor, incorporate a ceramic layer on their outer surface to enable them to defeat steel-core armor-piercing bullets. They may have features such as bulletproof glass windows, ambidextrous handles, and spotlights for use at night, and may be either hand-held or mounted on wheeled frames. They vary in size, with some being designed to protect only the upper torso and others designed to protect the whole body. Unlike a ballistic vest, projectiles successfully stopped by a ballistic shield will not transfer trauma or pain to the bearer, as they are designed to not be in direct contact with the body.

== See also ==
- SWAT-Bot
- Mobile personnel shield
