= Georges Schwob d'Héricourt =

French businessman and colonial business supporter

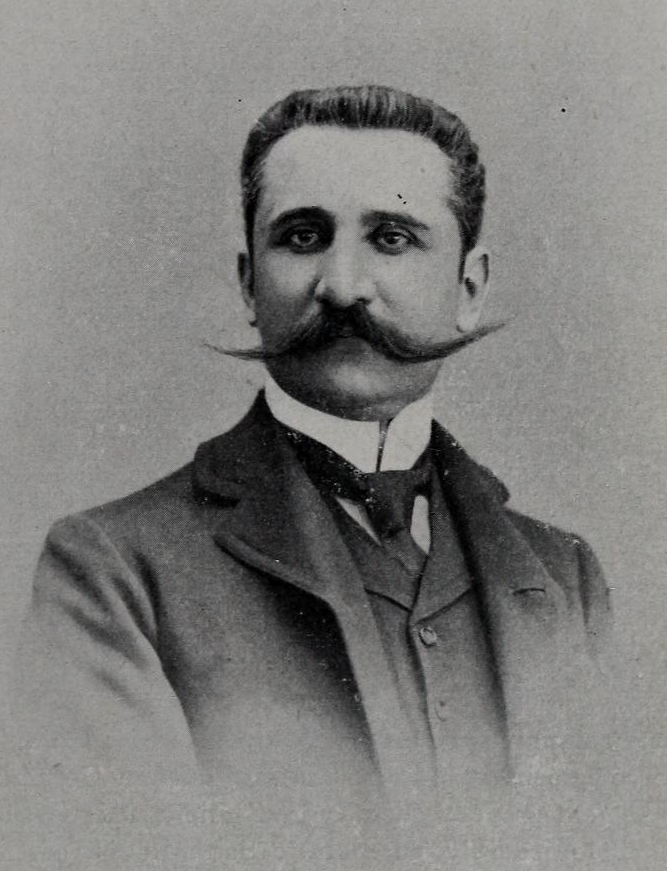
- Born: 21 January 1864; Lure, Haute-Saône, France
- Died: 30 August 1942 (aged 78); Aix-en-Provence, France
- Occupation: Businessman
- Known for: French colonial expositions.

Georges Schwob d'Héricourt (21 January 1864 – 30 August 1942) was a French businessman who was involved in a wide range of enterprises in France and her colonies. He was also responsible for exhibits of the French colonies in various international expositions.

== Early years ==
Georges Schwob d'Héricourt was born in Lure, Haute-Saône on 21 January 1864, son of Eugène Georges Schwob d'Héricourt (1830–1912) and Clarisse Anna Cahen (1836–1919). His family was Jewish, had been living in Alsace since 1681, and had established a major textile enterprise. His uncle Édouard Schwob (1844–1929) had added "d'Héricourt" to the family name after the town of Héricourt of which he was mayor from 1879 until his death. Georges Schwob d'Héricourt graduated from the École des hautes études commerciales (HEC). He married Emma Gradis, from an old Jewish family from Bordeaux who owned the Société française pour le commerce avec les colonies et l’étranger, a trading enterprise. His wife was the younger sister of Raoul Gradis and aunt of Gaston Gradis.

== Pre-war enterprises ==
Georges Schwob d'Héricourt started his career in small mining businesses. Charbonnages de Nikitowka was absorbed in 1905 by Société des sels gemmes et houillères de la Russie méridionale. Étains de Portugal was absorbed in 1907 by Société des Étains et wolfram de Portugal. He was also involved in tramway companies and in the Société d’électricité et d’automobile Mors. The automobile business of this company was taken over in 1907 by André Citroën, and Schwob became involved in the Citroen businesses. By 1908 he was president of several mutual aid societies and treasurer of the Union des tramways de France. He was one of the heads of the Maison Gradis, which handled two thirds of the imports from Martinique, and sat on the board of several industrial companies.

== Colonial exhibitions ==
From 1900 Schwob was involved in organizing colonial exhibitions. He was made a Knight of the Legion of Honour for the 1903 exhibition in Hanoi. He helped organize the French colonial exhibition at the 1904 St. Louis World's Fair, was in charge of the section of Commerce and Colonization at the 1905 Exposition Universelle de Liège and of the Trade and Industry section of the 1907 National Colonial Exhibition.

He was promoted to Officer of the Legion of Honour in 1908. At this time he was a member of the supreme council of the colonies and of the administrative council of the colonial office, vice-president of the national committee of colonial exhibitions, foreign trade adviser to France. He was in charge of the French colonies section at the Franco-British Exhibition (1908), and was appointed commissioner of the French colonies section of the International Exhibition of Brussels in 1910.

Schwob was attacked by several parliamentary deputies who accused him of ignoring exhibition themes that needed special skills in favor of general themes and spectacular or decorative exhibits. He was also accused of promoting foreign interests due to his business interests in the Société française des téléphones Berliner and the Brussels-based West African Fisheries company. In May 1925 Schwob was responsible for the colonial pavilions at the Exposition des Arts décoratifs in Paris. In 1928 he was named administrator of the general colonial agency, and was made president of the 1931 Vincennes Colonial Exhibition. He was awarded the Grand Cross of the Legion of Honour in 1931 for his work for the exhibition in Vincennes.

== Financier and businessman ==
In November 1915 Schwob was reappointed to the board of the Banque de l'Afrique Occidentale (BAO). At the end of World War I (1914–18) he introduced Adolphe Kégresse, a specialist in caterpillar tracks, to Hinstin and Citroën. In December 1920 he became administrator of the Cie générale des colonies. He became president of the Société française pour le Commerce avec les Colonies et l’Etranger, the new name adopted by the Maison Gradis in 1921. In 1922 Schwob was president of the Société industrielle marocaine, involved in activities that ranged from iron foundries to lemonade manufacture. He was involved in various other colonial enterprises including gas in Morocco, sawmills in the Côte d’Ivoire, agriculture and sugar in Madagascar and distilleries in Indochina. In 1923 he was director of the Est-Asiatique français company, extracting lumber in Siam and Laos for a sawmill in Saigon.

In 1924 Schwob was president of the syndicate for trade in raw rubber, and in 1925 was president of the syndicate for rice trade on the commercial exchange on Paris. He represented the Maison Gradis on the board of the Société Agricole et Industrielle de Ben-Cui, a rubber production company. From January 1926 he represented the BAO in the new Banque de Madagascar. In December 1932 he succeeded Auguste-Raphaël Fontaine as president of Distilleries de l’Indochine, holding this position until the start of the Japanese occupation in World War II (1939–45). He became vice-president of BAO in 1933. In the autumn of 1934 he was elected director of the Banque des produits alimentaires et coloniaux. He was president of La Réunion française in 1937, an insurance company, but in conformance with the anti-Jewish law of 1940 he resigned this position, although he remained a director until early in 1941. Schwob died in Aix-en-Provence on 30 August 1942.

== Sources ==
- "Georges Schwob d'Héricourt(1864-1942)" (PDF). Les entreprises coloniales françaises. 2014-09-30. Archived from the original (PDF) on 2016-03-04.
- "Georges SCHWOB D'HÉRICOURT". Geneanet.
- "Maison GRADIS à Bordeaux" (PDF). Archives Nationales.
- "Worms & Cie Archives 1949". Worms & Cie.
