= MacAdam Shield Shovel =

First World War Canadian infantry equipment

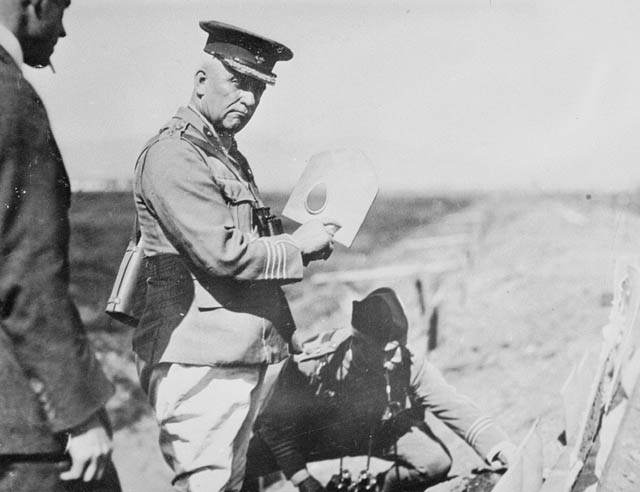
Sir Samuel Hughes holding a McAdam Shield Shovel.

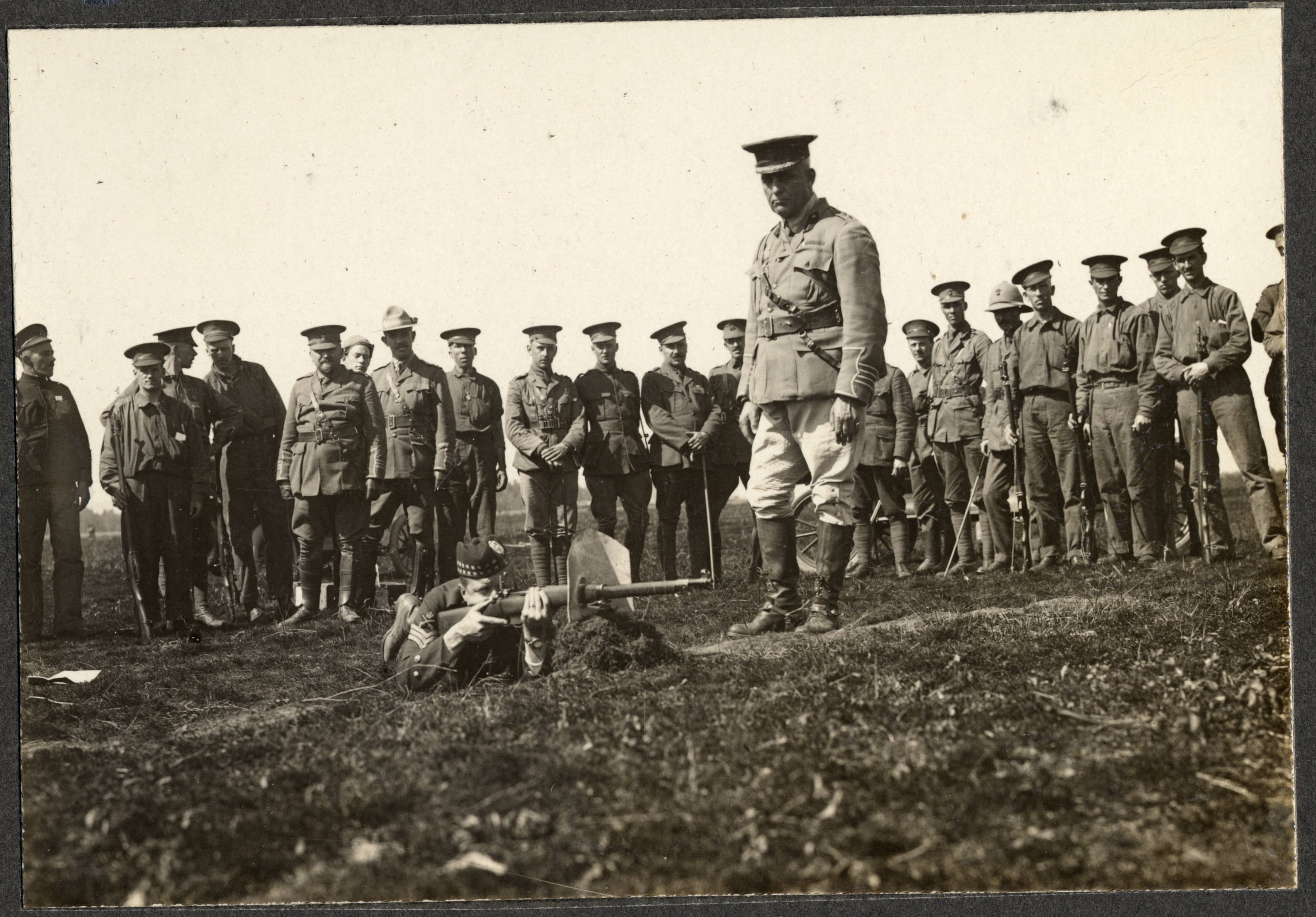
Colonel Sam Hughes watching Sergeant Hawkins demonstrating the MacAdam Shovel (Shield)

The MacAdam Shield-Shovel, also known as the Hughes Shovel, was an item of Canadian infantry equipment during the First World War, combining the concept of a sniper shield with the blade of a shovel. It was designed and patented by Sam Hughes, the Canadian minister for the Department of Militia and Defence in 1913, combining function as a shovel and as a shield. Ena MacAdam, Hughes' personal secretary, had first suggested the idea of a shield shovel to Hughes after she witnessed Swiss soldiers making field entrenchments during field exercises.

== Description ==
The MacAdam shield-shovel resembled the standard portable infantry spade of its day in both size and shape. In order to stop or deflect enemy fire, thicker steel was used in the construction of the blade; it measured at three-sixteenths of an inch thick. Heavy steel was also used to make the shovel's detachable handle which measured four feet in length. Unique to the shield-shovel was the inclusion of a 3.5 by 2 inch sight-hole in the blade. The shovel was intended to be used as a shield by folding the handle to ~90° toward the concave side of the blade, exposing the spike that ran along the handle opposite the blade. The spike would then be driven into the ground, resulting in the blade standing vertically and the handle resting on the ground behind it as a brace. In total, the MacAdam shield-shovel weighed 5 pounds 4 ounces.

The shovel was patented as CA157592 in name of Ena MacAdam, who listed occupation as 'Stenographer', dated 25 August 1914. She also patented it in the US as 1148180, filed on 24 August 1914 and published on 27 July 1915.

== Performance ==
In 1914, 25,000 shield-shovels were ordered and shipped to Europe for use by the 1st Canadian Division. Preliminary tests, however, revealed that the shovel's blade was incapable of stopping even small caliber bullets. Its value as a digging tool was also questioned as soldiers commented against the shovel's weight, its inability to be easily carried, and the fact that the blade was poor for shoveling loose soil as it contained a large sight-hole. With such a reputation, several high-ranking Canadian and British military officials refused to press the instrument into service. With these developments, an executive order was eventually issued for the shovels to be reduced to scrap. A total sum of $1,400 was recovered in the salvage; a figure far less than the original contract price, which tagged each MacAdam shield-shovel at $1.35. Despite being condemned by the military, a small following of Canadian snipers continued to use the shovel. Aware of the tool's limitations, they preferred to use them in a collective series for added protection.

== Assessment ==
The MacAdam Shield-Shovel currently stands in Canadian First World War historiography as an invention which was poorly conceived given that its intended purpose was never fully realized. Directorate Bill Rawling of the Canadian Department of Defence defends the MacAdam Shield-Shovel as being an attempt to improve the well-being of Canadian troops. Others feel the device is simply indicative of Sir Sam Hughes' greed and arrogance who often put his own well-being ahead that of his troops.

== Sources ==
- Haycock, Ronald G., Sam Hughes: The Public Career of a Controversial Canadian, 1885–1916. Toronto: Wilfrid Laurier University Press, 1986.
- Morton, Desmond. Marching to Armageddon: Canadians and the Great War 1914–1919. Toronto: Lester & Orpen Dennys Publications, 1989.
- Morton, Desmond. When Your Number's Up: The Canadian Soldier in the First World War. Toronto: Random House of Canada, 1993.
- Radley, Kenneth. We Lead Others Follow: First Canadian Division 1914–1918. Toronto: Vanwell Publishing Limited, 2006.
- Rawling, Bill. Surviving Trench War-fare: Technology and the Canadian Corps, 1914–1918. Toronto: University of Toronto Press, 1992.
