= Mantlet =

Movable defensive structure in medieval warfare

In medieval warfare a mantlet or mantelet was a portable wall or shelter used for stopping projectiles. Some versions used wheels for enhanced mobility. A mantlet could protect one or several soldiers.

In the First World War (1914-1918) French soldiers used a mantlet-style device to attack barbed wire entanglements.

== Gun mantlet ==
In military use from pre-WW2 onward, a mantlet is the thick, protective steel frontal shield, usually able to elevate and depress, which houses the main gun on an armoured tank, examples being Tiger Tank, Sherman Tank and Churchill Tank.

== Gallery ==
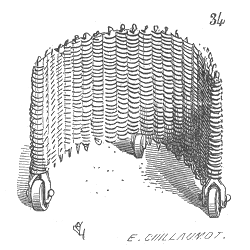
A wicker U-shaped mantlet on wheels. Wicker was a popular material for siege defences as it was lightweight, effective and easy to construct. The wheels add further mobility which meant that the user could move forward slowly but surely.

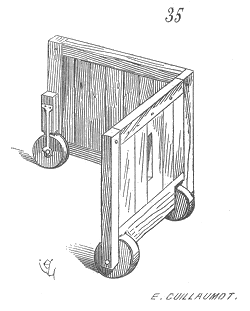
A wood-planked, L-shaped mantlet on wheels. Wooden-planked construction with proper joinery and even arrow slots would make this a more hard-wearing and expensive option. It would be heavier to push and would require more time and skill to construct; this might not be the sort one would use when attacking uphill.

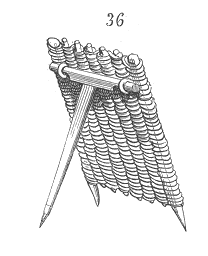
A pavise like wicker mantlet. This is probably the cheapest and simplest option, but it would not be as hard wearing and does not offer as much cover as the other variations.

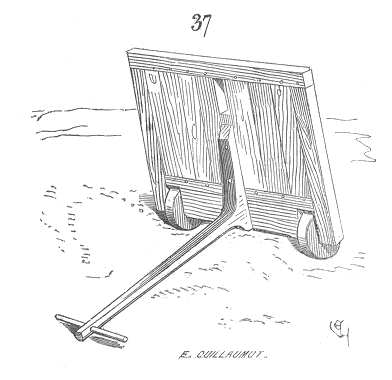
A wood-planked mantlet on wheels, affording the hard protection of a wooden structure but still being mobile. The lever-like handle would allow the mantlet to be pushed along and then held upright in a stationary situation.

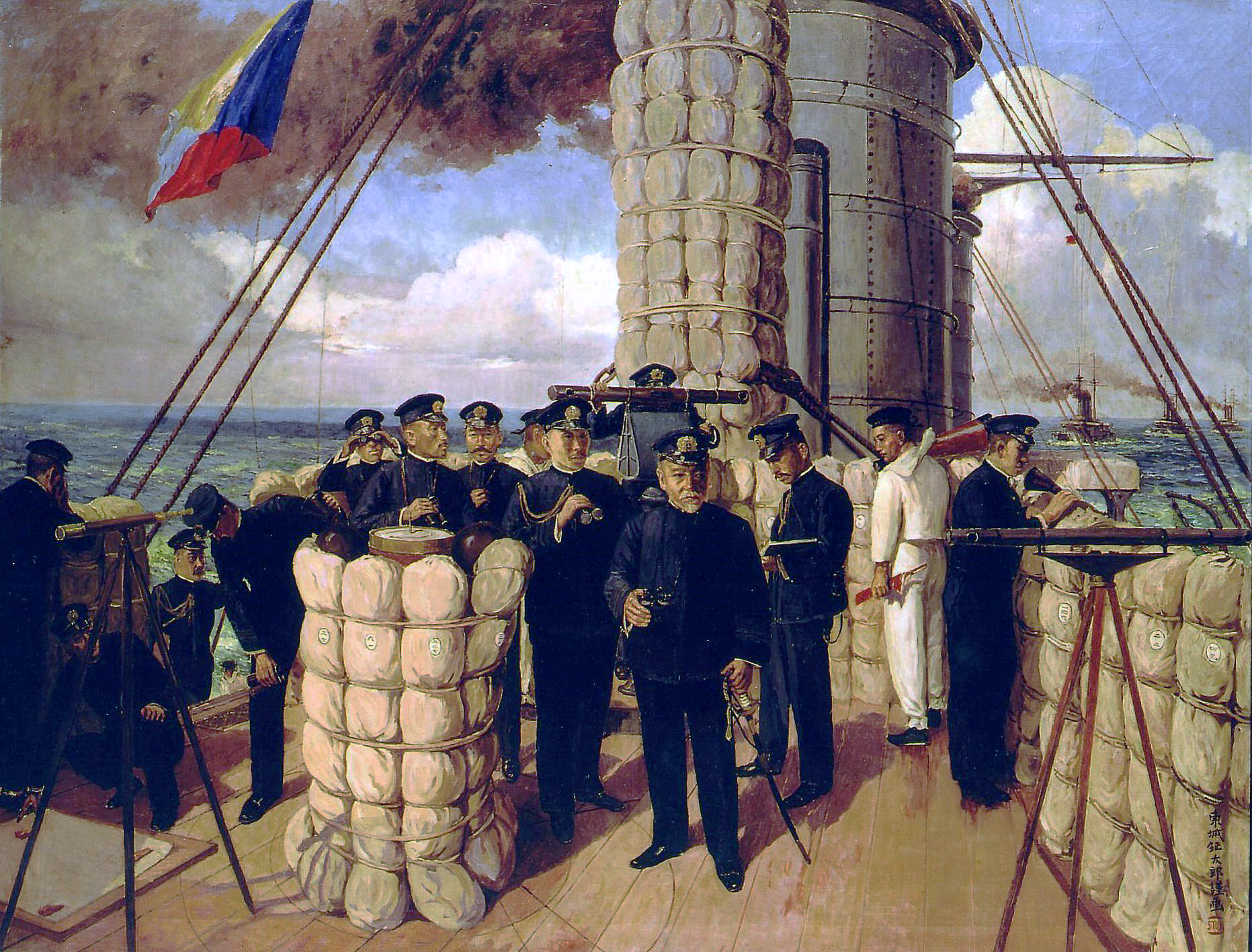
The Japanese commonly used mantlets composed of bundles of blankets wrapped in a mattress to reduce the effects of shell shrapnel. Print of Admiral Togo aboard the Mikasa during the Battle of Tsushima (May 27, 1905).

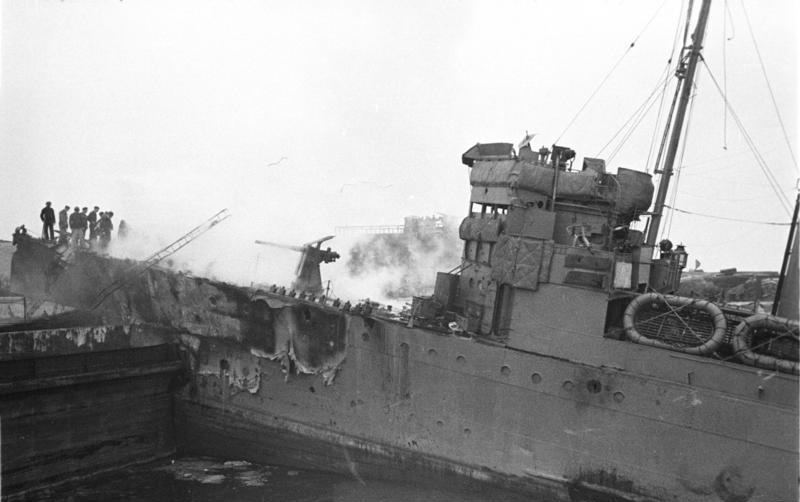
In the Royal Navy from the 18th century onwards, hammocks and bedding were rolled up each day and stowed in netting along the ship's sides to air. They functioned as mantlets to reduce the effect of splinters, grape and musket fire in battle. By World War I these had been replaced by splinter mats to protect exposed areas such as the bridge. These were again used in World War II. A German photo of HMS Campbeltown after the St Nazaire Raid before she exploded.

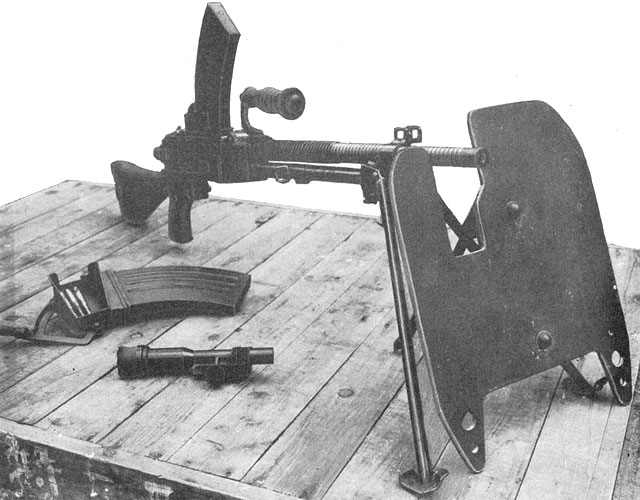
A Japanese Type 96 light machine gun with a personal mantlet

== See also ==
- Chemise (wall)
- Gabion
- Pavise
- Mantelets
- Testudo formation
