= Barbed wire =

Steel fencing wire with sharp points

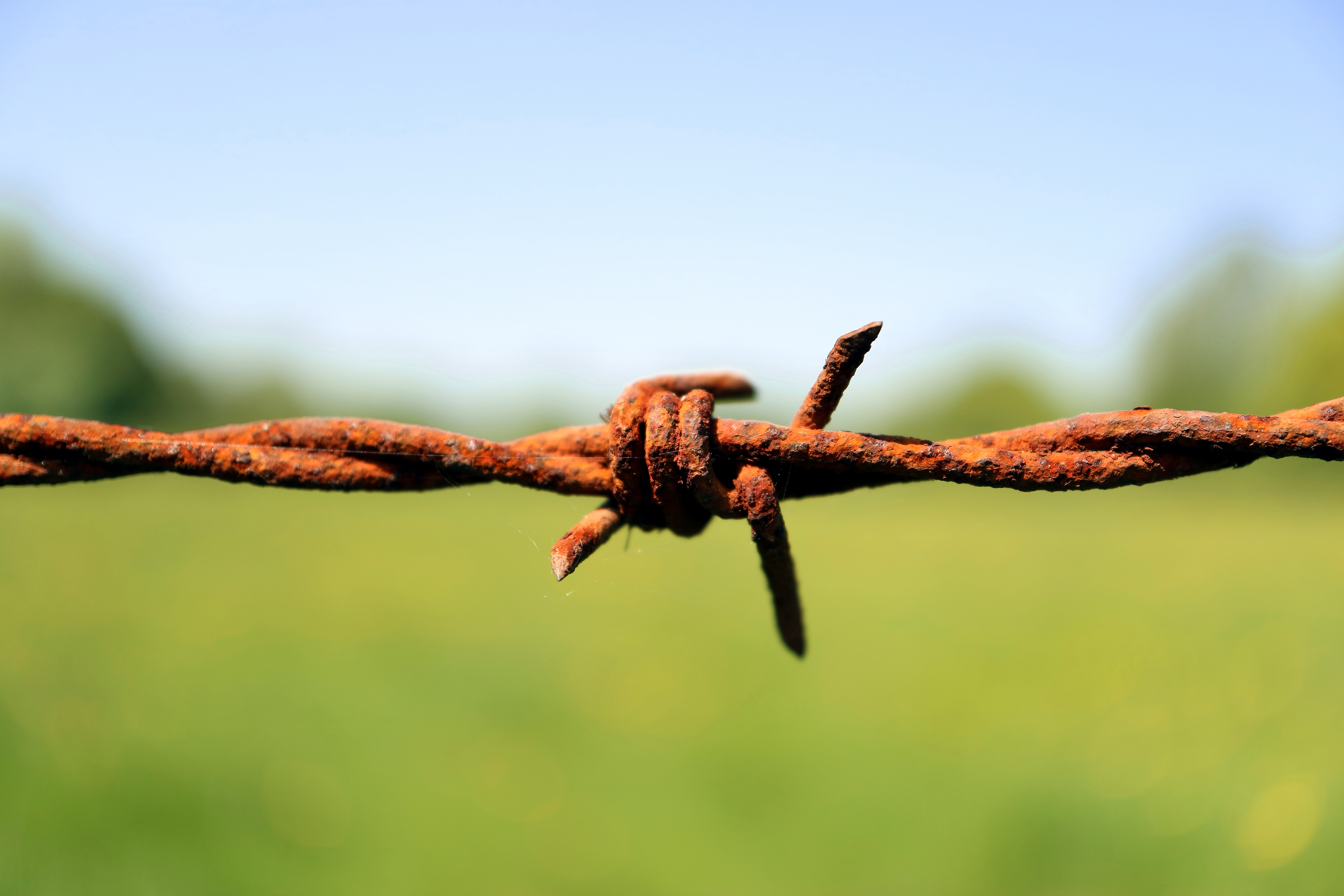
Close-up of a barbed wire

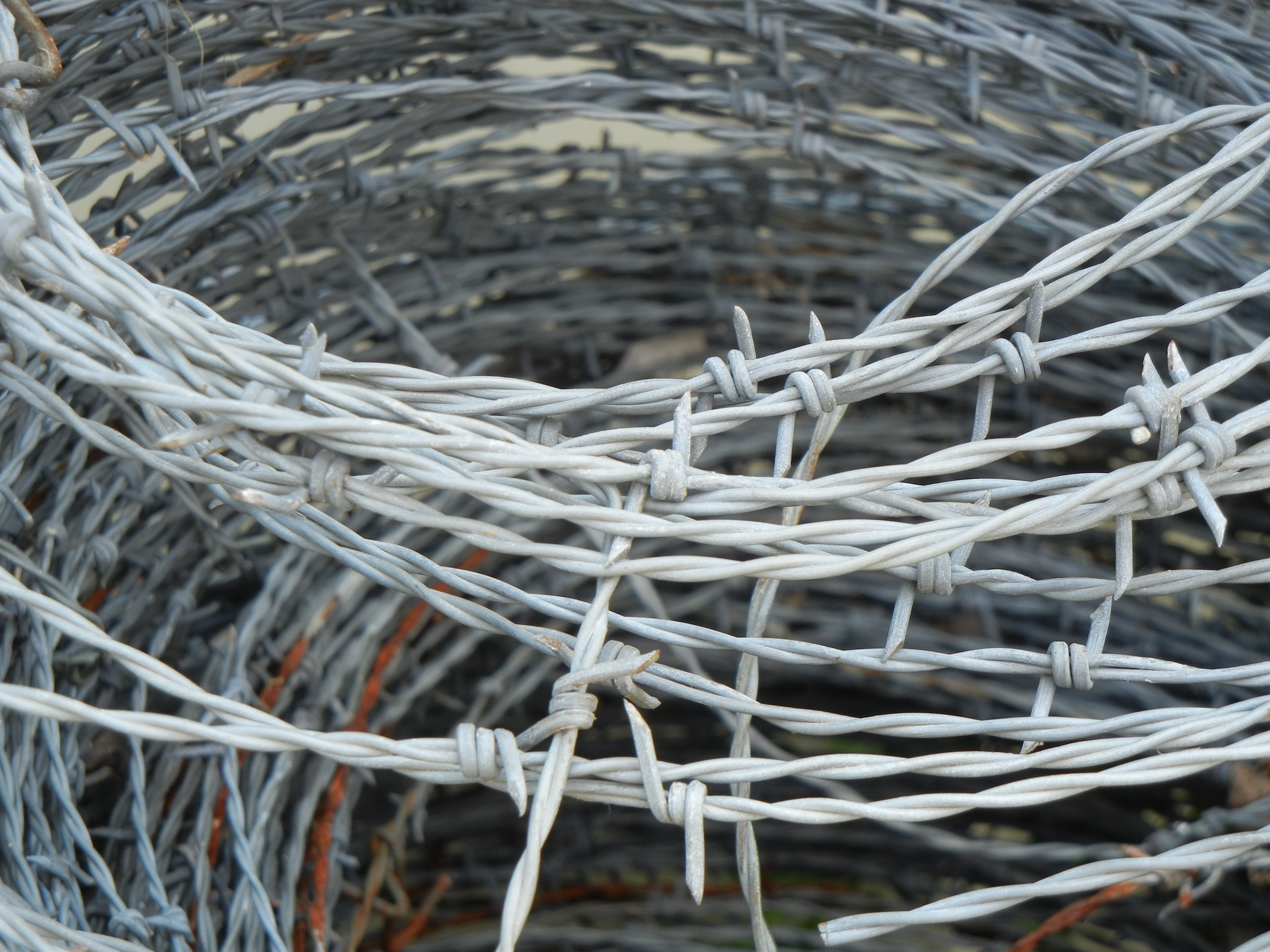
Roll of modern agricultural barbed wire

Barbed wire is a type of steel fencing wire constructed with sharp edges or points arranged at intervals along the strands. Its primary use is the construction of inexpensive fences, and it is also used as a security measure atop walls surrounding property. As a wire obstacle, it is a major feature of the fortifications in trench warfare.

A person or animal trying to pass through or over barbed wire will suffer discomfort and possibly injury. Barbed wire fencing requires only fence posts, wire, and fixing devices such as staples. It is simple to construct and quick to erect, even by an unskilled person.

The first patent in the United States for barbed wire was issued in 1867 to Lucien B. Smith of Kent, Ohio, who is regarded as the inventor. Joseph F. Glidden of DeKalb, Illinois, received a patent for the modern invention in 1874 after he made his own modifications to previous versions.

Wire fences are cheaper and easier to erect than their alternatives (one such alternative is Osage orange, a thorny bush that is time-consuming to transplant and grow). When wire fences became widely available in the United States in the late 19th century, it became more affordable to fence much larger areas than before, and intensive animal husbandry was made practical on a much larger scale.

An example of the costs of fencing with lumber immediately prior to the invention of barbed wire can be found with the first farmers in the Fresno, California, area, who spent nearly $4,000 (equivalent to $108,000 in 2025) to have wood for fencing delivered and erected to protect 2,500 acres (1,000 ha) of wheat crop from free-ranging livestock in 1872.

== Design ==
Materials

- Zinc-coated steel wire. Galvanized steel wire is the most widely used steel wire during barbed wire production. It has three types: commercial type, Class 1 type and Class 3 type. It is also well known as electric galvanized steel wire and hot dipped galvanized steel wire.
- Zinc-aluminum alloy coated steel wire. Barbed wire is available with zinc, 5% or 10% aluminum alloy and mischmetal steel wire, which is also known as Galfan wire.
- Polymer-coated steel wire. Zinc steel wire or zinc-aluminum steel wire with PVC, PE or other organic polymer coating.
- Stainless steel wire. It is available with SAE 304, 316 and other materials.

Strand structure

- Single strand. Simple and light duty structure with single line wire (also known as strand wire) and barbs.
- Double strand. Conventional structure with double strand wire (line wire) and barbs.

Barb structure

- Single barb. Also known as 2-point barbed wire. It uses single barb wire twisted on the line wire (strand wire).
- Double barb. Also known as 4-point barbed wire. Two barb wires twisted on the line wire (strand wire).

Twist type

- Conventional twist. The strand wire (line wire) are twisted in single direction, which is also known as traditional twist. Besides, the barb wires are twisted between the two strand wire (line wire).
- Reverse twist. The strand wire (line wire) are twisted in opposite direction. Besides, the barb wires are twisted outside of the two line wire.

=== Nominal diameter ===
Gauge	Imperial	Metric
12 1/2 gauge	0.099 in.	2.51 mm
13 gauge	0.093 in.	2.34 mm
13 3/4 gauge	0.083 in.	2.11 mm
14 gauge	0.080 in.	2.03 mm
16 1/2 gauge	0.058 in.	1.47 mm

== History ==
=== Before 1865 ===
Fencing consisting of flat and thin wire was first proposed in France, by Leonce Eugene Grassin-Baledans in 1860. His design consisted of bristling points, creating a fence that was painful to cross. In April 1865 Louis François Janin proposed a double wire with diamond-shaped metal barbs; Francois was granted a patent. Michael Kelly from New York had a similar idea, and proposed that the fencing should be used specifically for deterring animals.

More patents followed, and in 1867 alone there were six patents issued for barbed wire. Only two of them addressed livestock deterrence, one of which was from American Lucien B. Smith of Ohio. Before 1870, westward movement in the United States was largely across the plains with little or no settlement occurring. After the American Civil War the plains were extensively settled, consolidating America's dominance over them.

Ranchers moved out on the plains, and needed to fence their land in against encroaching farmers and other ranchers. The railroads throughout the growing West needed to keep livestock off their tracks, and farmers needed to keep stray cattle from trampling their crops. Traditional fence materials used in the Eastern U.S., like wood and stone, were expensive to use in the large open spaces of the plains, and hedging was not reliable in the rocky, clay-based and rain-starved dusty soils. A cost-effective alternative was needed to make cattle operations profitable.

=== 1873 meeting and initial development ===
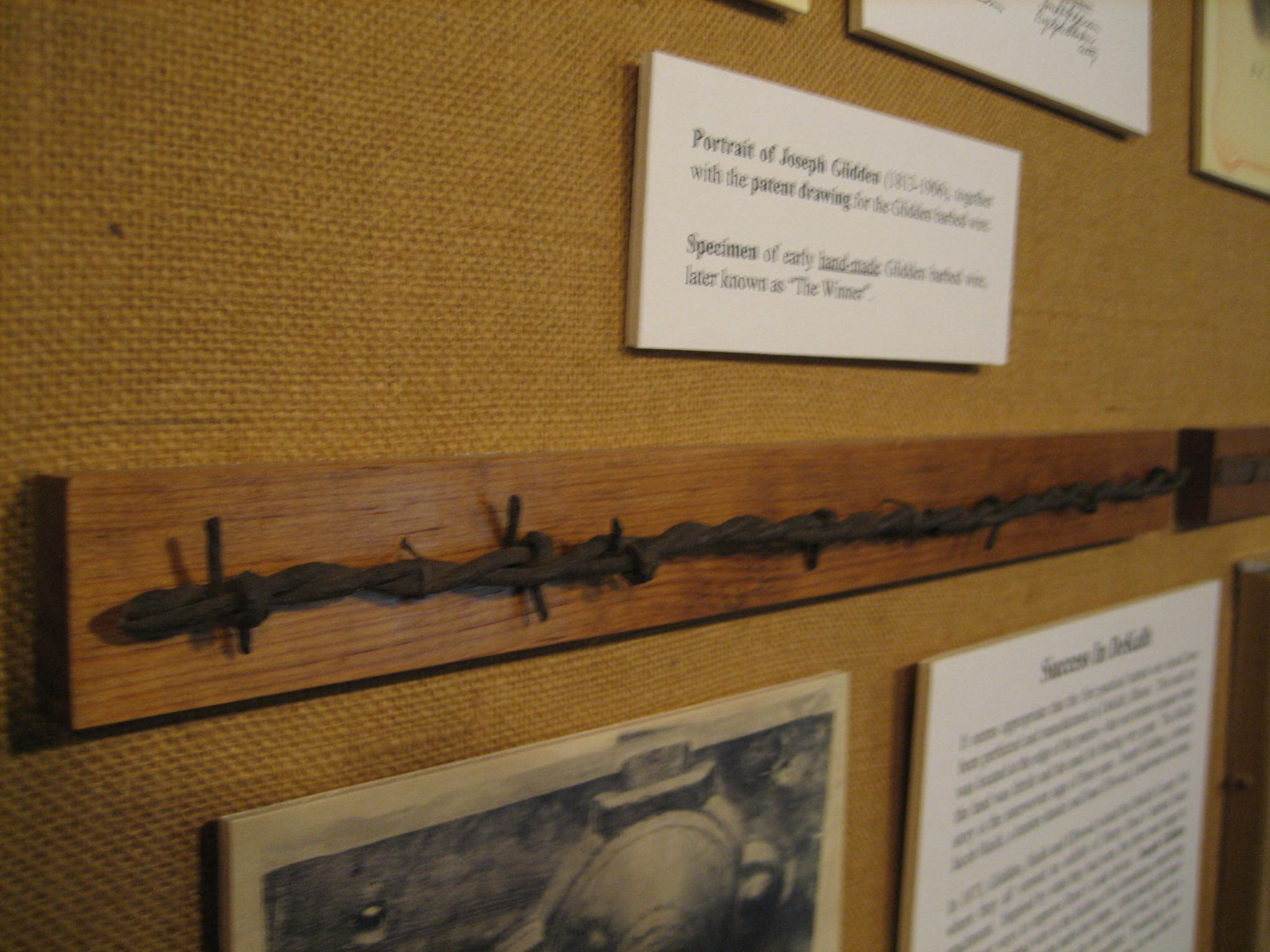
An early handmade specimen of Glidden's "The Winner" on display at the Barbed Wire History Museum in DeKalb, Illinois

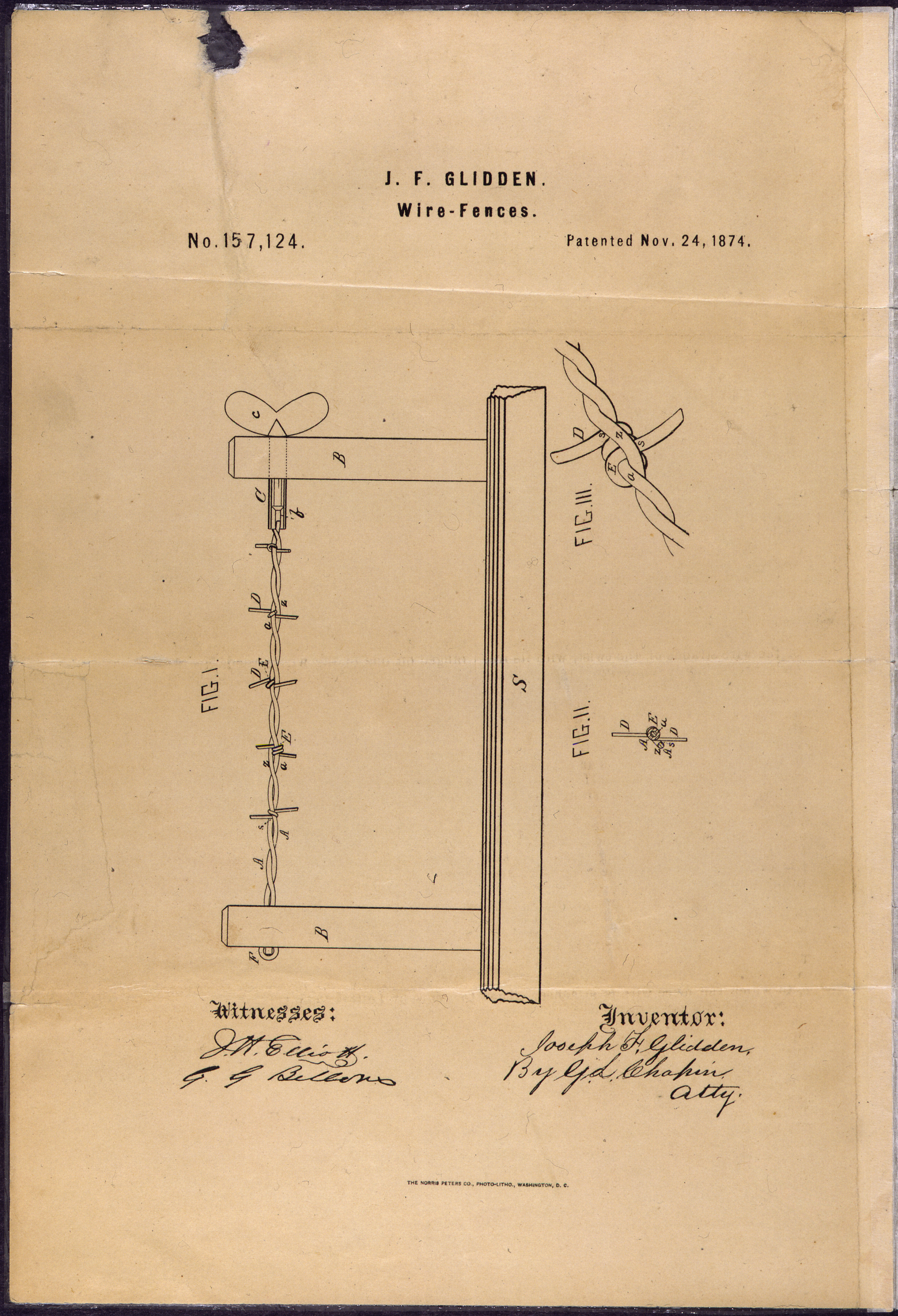
Patent drawing for Joseph F. Glidden's Improvement to barbed wire (24 November 1874)

The "Big Four" in barbed wire were Joseph Glidden, Jacob Haish, Charles Francis Washburn, and Isaac L. Ellwood. Glidden, a farmer in 1873 and the first of the "Big Four", is often credited for designing a successful sturdy barbed wire product, but he let others popularize it for him. Glidden's idea came from a display at a fair in DeKalb, Illinois in 1873, by Henry B. Rose. Rose had patented "The Wooden Strip with Metallic Points" in May 1873.

This was simply a wooden block with wire protrusions designed to keep cows from breaching the fence. That day, Glidden was accompanied by two other men, Isaac L. Ellwood, a hardware dealer and Jacob Haish, a lumber merchant. Like Glidden, they both wanted to create a more durable wire fence with fixed barbs. Glidden experimented with a grindstone to twist two wires together to hold the barbs on the wire in place. The barbs were created from experiments with a coffee mill from his home.

Later Glidden was joined by Ellwood who knew his design could not compete with Glidden's for which he applied for a patent in October 1873. Meanwhile, Haish, who had already secured several patents for barbed wire design, applied for a patent on his third type of wire, the S barb, and accused Glidden of interference, deferring Glidden's approval for his patented wire, nicknamed "The Winner", until November 24, 1874.

Barbed wire production greatly increased with Glidden and Ellwood's establishment of the Barb Fence Company in DeKalb following the success of "The Winner". The company's success attracted the attention of Charles Francis Washburn, Vice President of Washburn & Moen Manufacturing Company, an important producer of plain wire in the Eastern U.S. Washburn visited DeKalb and convinced Glidden to sell his stake in the Barb Wire Fence Company, while Ellwood stayed in DeKalb and renamed the company I.L Ellwood & Company of DeKalb.

=== Promotion and consolidation ===
In the late 1870s, John Warne Gates of Illinois began to promote barbed wire, now a proven product, in the lucrative markets of Texas. At first, Texans were hesitant, as they feared that cattle might be harmed, or that the North was somehow trying to make profits from the South. There was also conflict between the farmers who wanted fencing and the ranchers who were losing the open range.

Demonstrations by Gates in San Antonio in 1876 showed that the wire could keep cattle contained, and sales then increased dramatically. Gates eventually parted company with Ellwood and became a barbed wire baron in his own right. Throughout the height of barbed wire sales in the late 19th century, Washburn, Ellwood, Gates, and Haish competed with one another. Ellwood and Gates eventually joined forces again to create the American Steel and Wire Company, later acquired by The U.S. Steel Corporation.

Between 1873 and 1899 there were as many as 150 companies manufacturing barbed wire. Investors knew that the business required minimal capital, and almost anyone with determination could profit by manufacturing a new wire design. There was then a sharp decline in the number of manufacturers, and many were consolidated into larger companies, notably the American Steel and Wire Company, formed by the merging of Gates's and Washburn's and Ellwood's industries.

Smaller companies were decimated because of economies of scale and the smaller pool of consumers available to them, compared to the larger corporations. The American Steel and Wire Company established in 1899 employed vertical integration: it controlled all aspects of production, from producing the steel rods to making many different wire and nail products from that steel. It later became part of U.S. Steel, and barbed wire remained a major source of revenue.

A woman shown caught in barbed wire in an early 20th century advertisement

=== In the American West ===
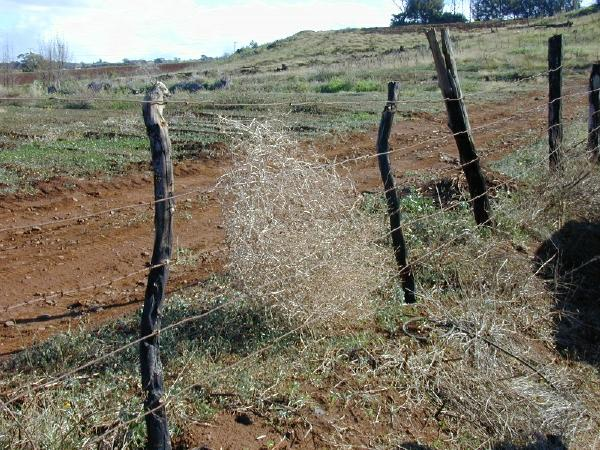
A rangeland fence which has caught a tumbleweed

Barbed wire was important in protecting range rights in the Western U.S. Although some ranchers put notices in newspapers claiming land areas, and joined stockgrowers associations to help enforce their claims, livestock continued to cross range boundaries. Fences of smooth wire did not hold stock well, and hedges were difficult to grow and maintain. Barbed wire's introduction in the West in the 1870s dramatically reduced the cost of enclosing land.

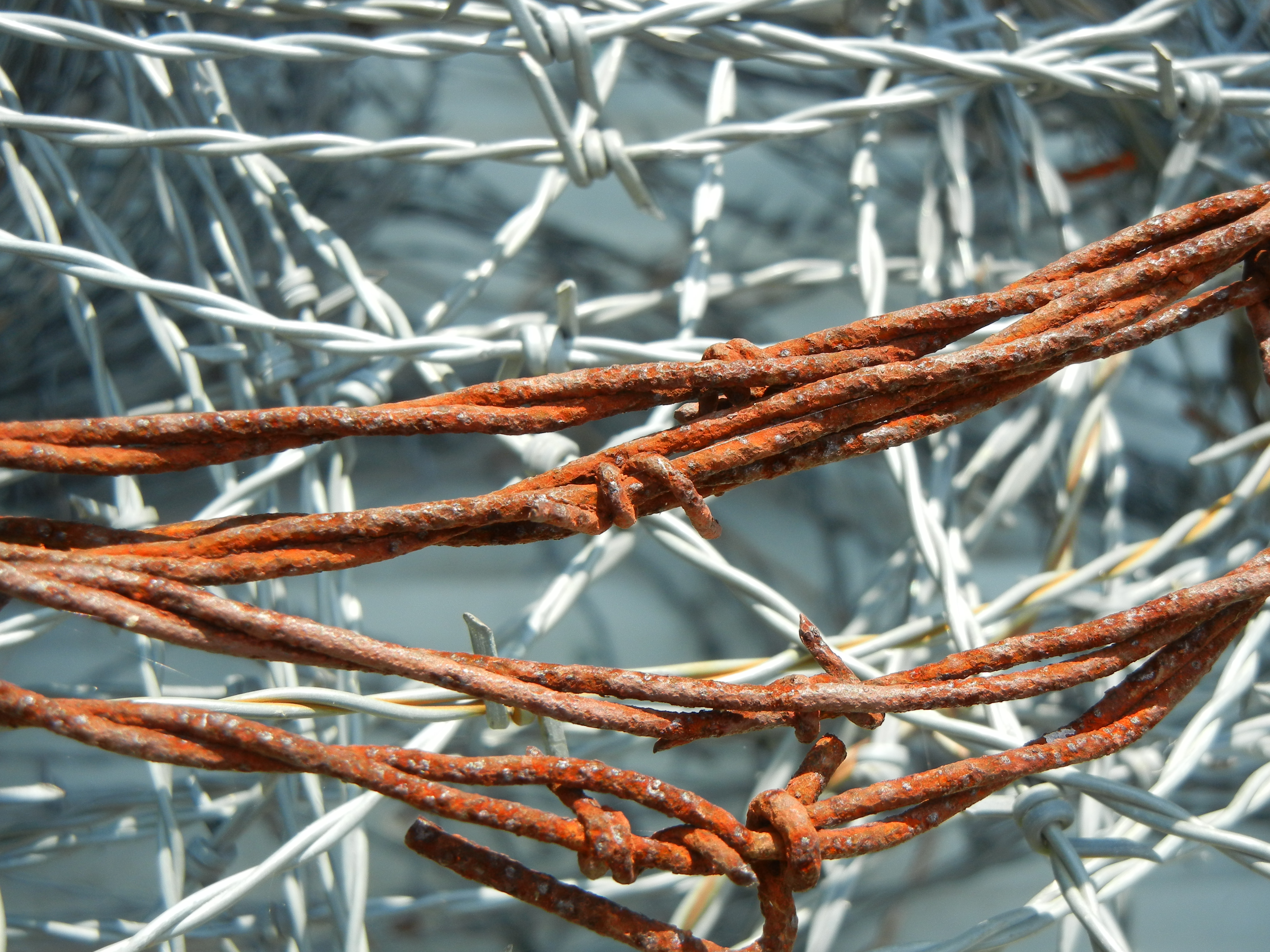
Rusted barbed wire in a roll

One fan wrote the inventor Joseph Glidden:

it takes no room, exhausts no soil, shades no vegetation, is proof against high winds, makes no snowdrifts, and is both durable and cheap.

Barbed wire emerged as a major source of conflict with the so-called "Big Die Up" incident in the 1880s. This occurred because of the instinctual migrations of cattle away from the blizzard conditions of the Northern Plains to the warmer and plentiful Southern Plains, but by the early 1880s this area was already divided and claimed by ranchers. The ranchers in place, especially in the Texas Panhandle, knew that their holdings could not support the grazing of additional cattle, so the only alternative was to block the migrations with barb wire fencing.

Many of the herds were decimated in the winter of 1885, with some losing as many as three-quarters of all animals when they could not find a way around the fence. Later other smaller scale cattlemen, especially in central Texas, opposed the closing of the open range, and began cutting fences to allow cattle to pass through to find grazing land. In this transition zone between the agricultural regions to the south and the rangeland to the north, conflict erupted, with vigilantes joining the scene causing chaos and even death. The Fence Cutting Wars ended with the passage of a Texas law in 1884 that made fence cutting a felony. Other states followed, although conflicts occurred through the early years of the 20th century. An 1885 federal law forbade placing such fences across the public domain.

Barbed wire is cited by historians as the invention that tamed the West. Herding large numbers of cattle on open range required significant manpower to catch strays. Barbed wire provided an inexpensive method to control the movement of cattle. By the beginning of the 20th century, large numbers of cowboys were unnecessary.

=== In the Southwest United States ===
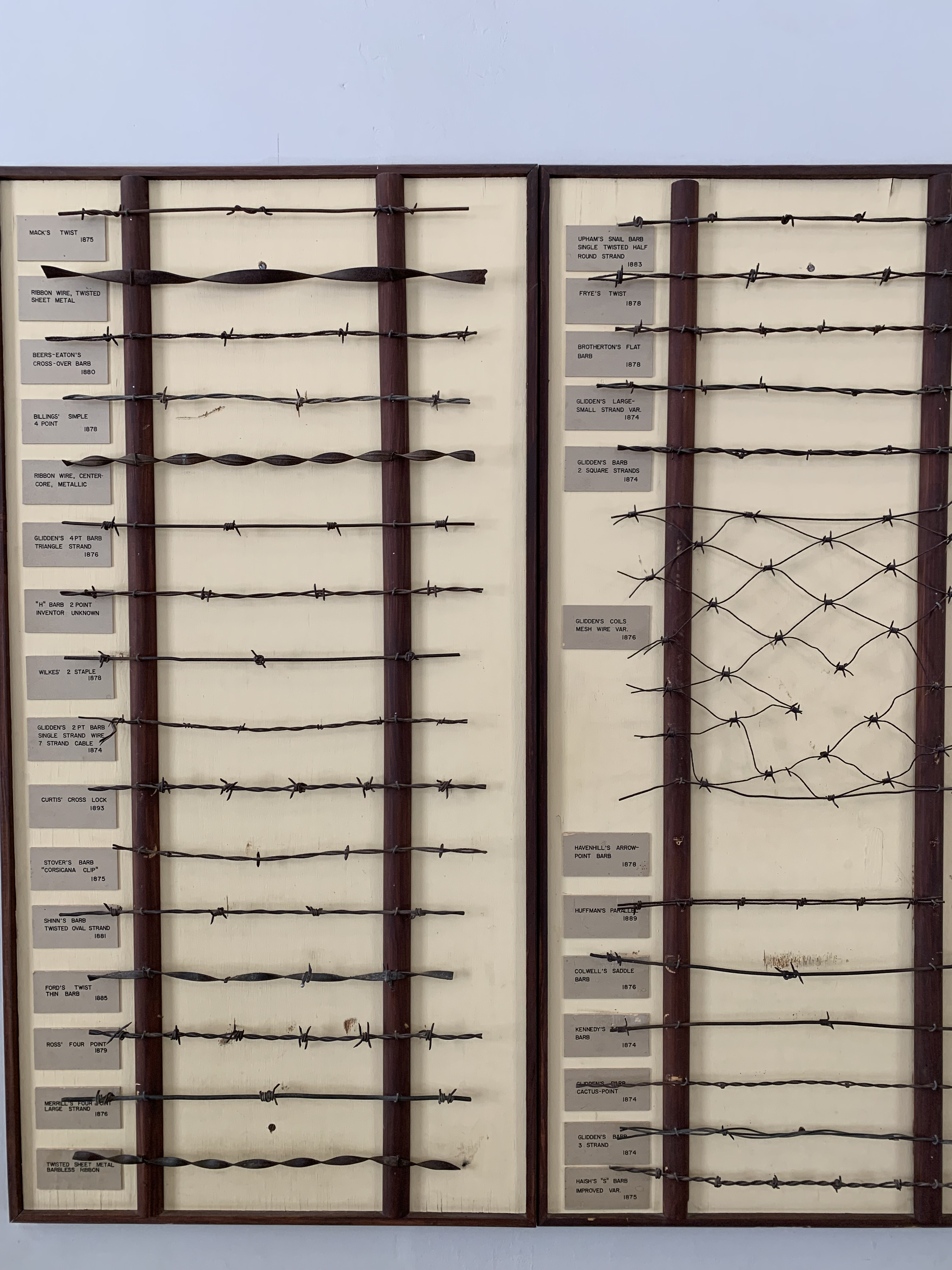
Examples of barbed wire used in the late 1800s in Arizona Territory

John Warne Gates demonstrated barbed wire for Washburn and Moen in Military Plaza, San Antonio, Texas in 1876. The demonstration showing cattle restrained by the new kind of fencing was followed immediately by invitations to the Menger Hotel to place orders. Gates subsequently had a falling out with Washburn and Moen and Isaac Ellwood. He moved to St. Louis and founded the Southern Wire Company, which became the largest manufacturer of unlicensed or "bootleg" barbed wire.

An 1880 US District Court decision upheld the validity of the Glidden patent, effectively establishing a monopoly. This decision was affirmed by the US Supreme Court in 1892. In 1898, Gates took control of Washburn and Moen, and created the American Steel and Wire monopoly, which became a part of the United States Steel Corporation.

This led to disputes known as the range wars between open range ranchers and farmers in the late 19th century. These were similar to the disputes which resulted from enclosure laws in England in the early 18th century. These disputes were decisively settled in favor of the farmers, and heavy penalties were instituted for cutting a barbed wire fence. Within 2 years, nearly all of the open range had been fenced in under private ownership. For this reason, some historians have dated the end of the Old West era of American history to the invention and subsequent proliferation of barbed wire.

== Installation ==
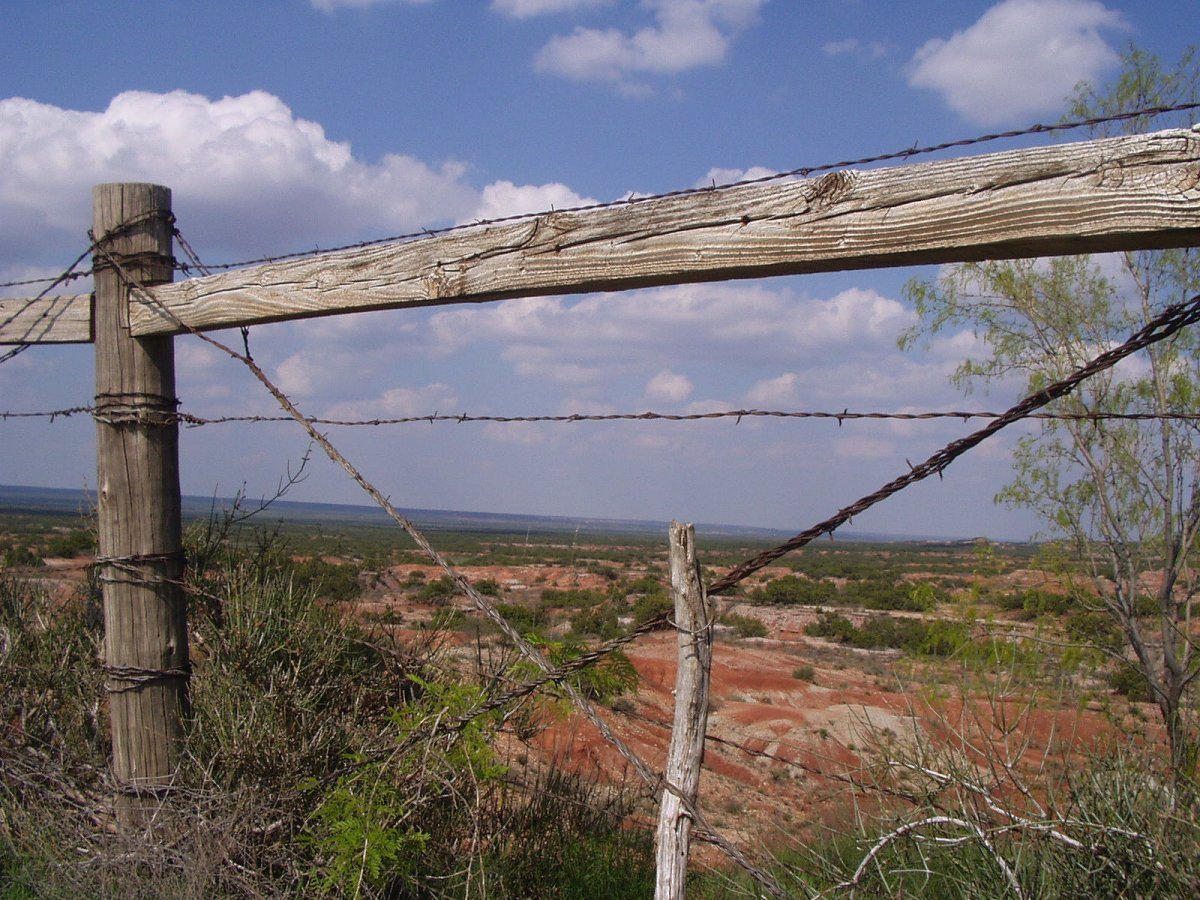
Barbed wire fence in line brace

The most important and most time-consuming part of a barbed wire fence is constructing the corner post and the bracing assembly. A barbed wire fence is under tremendous tension, often up to half a ton, and so the corner post's sole function is to resist the tension of the fence spans connected to it. The bracing keeps the corner post vertical and prevents slack from developing in the fence.

Brace posts are placed in-line about 2.5 metres (8 ft) from the corner post. A horizontal compression brace connects the top of the two posts, and a diagonal wire connects the top of the brace post to the bottom of the corner post. This diagonal wire prevents the brace post from leaning, which in turn allows the horizontal brace to prevent the corner post from leaning into the brace post. A second set of brace posts (forming a double brace) is used whenever the barbed wire span exceeds 60 metres (200 ft).

When the barbed wire span exceeds 200 m (650 ft), a braced line assembly is added in-line. This has the function of a corner post and brace assembly but handles tension from opposite sides. It uses diagonal brace wire that connects the tops to the bottoms of all adjacent posts.

Line posts are installed along the span of the fence at intervals of 2.5 to 15 m (8 to 50 ft). An interval of 5 m (16 ft) is most common. Heavy livestock and crowded pasture demands the smaller spacing. The sole function of a line post is not to take up slack but to keep the barbed wire strands spaced equally and off the ground.

Once these posts and bracing have been erected, the wire is wrapped around one corner post, held with a hitch (a timber hitch works well for this) often using a staple to hold the height and then reeled out along the span of the fence replacing the roll every 400 m. It is then wrapped around the opposite corner post, pulled tightly with wire stretchers, and sometimes nailed with more fence staples, although this may make readjustment of tension or replacement of the wire more difficult. Then it is attached to all of the line posts with fencing staples driven in partially to allow stretching of the wire.

There are several ways to anchor the wire to a corner post:

- Hand-knotting. The wire is wrapped around the corner post and knotted by hand. This is the most common method of attaching wire to a corner post. A timber hitch works well as it stays better with wire than with rope.
- Crimp sleeves. The wire is wrapped around the corner post and bound to the incoming wire using metal sleeves which are crimped using lock cutters. This method should be avoided because while sleeves can work well on repairs in the middle of the fence where there is not enough wire for hand knotting, they tend to slip when under tension.
- Wire vise. The wire is passed through a hole drilled into the corner post and is anchored on the far side.
- Wire wrap. The wire is wrapped around the corner post and wrapped onto a special, gritted helical wire which also wraps around the incoming wire, with friction holding it in place.

Barbed wire for agriculture use is typically double-strand 12 1/2-gauge, zinc-coated (galvanized) steel and comes in rolls of 400 m (1,320 ft) length. Barbed wire is usually placed on the inner (pasture) side of the posts. Where a fence runs between two pastures livestock could be with the wire on the outside or on both sides of the fence.

Galvanized wire is classified into three categories; Classes I, II, and III. Class I has the thinnest coating and the shortest life expectancy. A wire with Class I coating will start showing general rusting in 8 to 10 years, while the same wire with Class III coating will show rust in 15 to 20 years. Aluminum-coated wire is occasionally used, and yields a longer life.

Corner posts are 15 to 20 centimetres (6 to 8 in) in diameter or larger, and a minimum 2.5 metres (8 ft) in length may consist of treated wood or from durable on-site trees such as osage orange, black locust, red cedar, or red mulberry, also railroad ties, telephone, and power poles are salvaged to be used as corner posts (poles and railroad ties were often treated with chemicals determined to be an environmental hazard and cannot be reused in some jurisdictions). In Canada, spruce posts are sold for this purpose. Posts are 10 centimetres (4 in) in diameter driven at least 1.2 metres (4 ft) and may be anchored in a concrete base 51 centimetres (20 in) square and 110 centimetres (42 in) deep. Iron posts, if used, are a minimum 64 millimetres (2.5 in) in diameter. Bracing wire is typically smooth 9-gauge. Line posts are set to a depth of about 76 centimetres (30 in). Conversely, steel posts are not as stiff as wood, and wires are fastened with slips along fixed teeth, which means variations in driving height affect wire spacing.

During the First World War, screw pickets were used for the installation of wire obstacles; these were metal rods with eyelets for holding strands of wire, and a corkscrew-like end that could literally be screwed into the ground rather than hammered, so that wiring parties could work at night near enemy soldiers and not reveal their position by the sound of hammers.

=== Gates ===
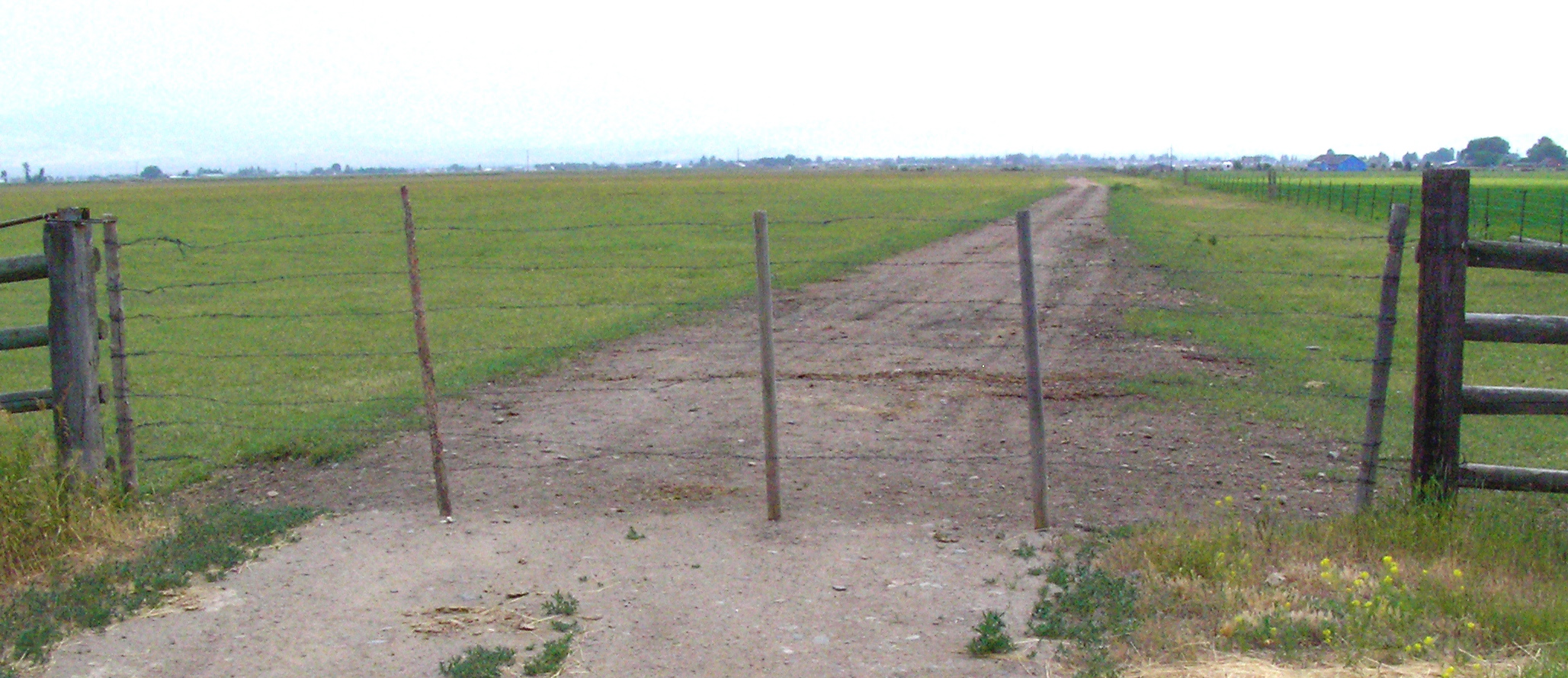
Wire or "Hampshire" gate

As with any fence, barbed wire fences require gates to allow the passage of persons, vehicles and farm implements. Gates vary in width from 3.5 metres (12 ft) to allow the passage of vehicles and tractors, to 12 metres (40 ft) on farm land to pass combines and swathers.

One style of gate is called the Hampshire gate in the UK, a New Zealand gate in some areas, and often simply a "gate" elsewhere. Made of wire with posts attached at both ends and in the middle, it is permanently wired on one side and attaches to a gate post with wire loops on the other. Most designs can be opened by hand, though some gates that are frequently opened and closed may have a lever attached to assist in bringing the upper wire loop over the gate post.

Gates for cattle tend to have four wires when along a three wire fence, as cattle tend to put more stress on gates, particularly on corner gates. The fence on each side of the gate ends with two corner posts braced or unbraced depending on the size of the post. An unpounded post (often an old broken post) is held to one corner post with wire rings which act as hinges. On the other end a full-length post, the tractor post, is placed with the pointed end upwards with a ring on the bottom stapled to the other corner post, the latch post, and on top a ring is stapled to the tractor post, tied with a Stockgrower's Lash or one of numerous other opening bindings. Wires are then tied around the post at one end then run to the other end where they are stretched by hand or with a stretcher, before posts are stapled on every 1.2 metres (4 ft). Often this type of gate is called a portagee fence or a portagee gate in various ranching communities of coastal Central California.

Most gates can be opened by push post. The chain is then wrapped around the tractor post and pulled onto the nail, stronger people can pull the gate tighter but anyone can jar off the chain to open the gate.

== Uses ==
=== Agriculture ===
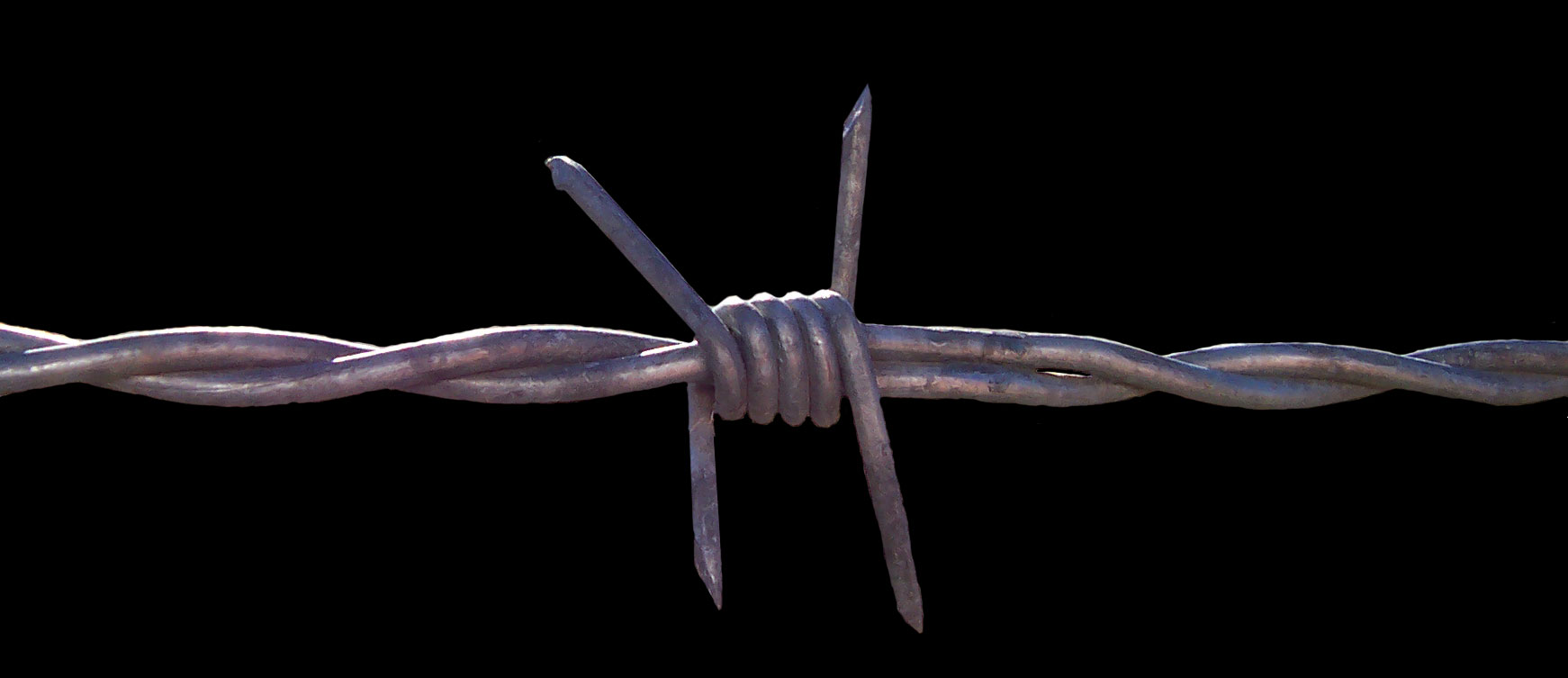
Modern barbed wire

Barbed wire fences remain the standard fencing technology for enclosing cattle in most regions of the United States, but not all countries. The wire is aligned under tension between heavy, braced, fence posts (strainer posts) and then held at the correct height by being attached to wooden or steel fence posts, and/or with battens in between.

The gaps between posts vary depending on type and terrain. On short fences in hilly country, steel posts may be placed every 3 metres (3 yd), while in flat terrain with long spans and relatively few stock they may be spaced up to 30 to 50 metres (33 to 55 yd) apart. Wooden posts are normally spaced at 10 metres (11 yd) on all terrain, with 4 or 5 battens in between. However, many farmers place posts 2 metres (2 yd) apart as battens can bend, causing wires to close in on one another.

Barbed wire for agricultural fencing is typically available in two varieties: soft or mild-steel wire and high-tensile. Both types are galvanized for longevity. High-tensile wire is made with thinner but higher-strength steel. Its greater strength makes fences longer lasting because it resists stretching and loosening better, coping with expansion and contraction caused by heat and animal pressure by stretching and relaxing within wider elastic limits. It also supports longer spans, but because of its elastic (springy) nature, it is harder to handle and somewhat dangerous for inexperienced fencers. Soft wire is much easier to work but is less durable and only suitable for short spans such as repairs and gates, where it is less likely to tangle.

In high soil-fertility areas where dairy cattle are used in great numbers, 5- or 7-wire fences are common as the main boundary and internal dividing fences. On sheep farms 7-wire fences are common with the second (from bottom) to fifth wire being plain wire. In New Zealand wire fences must provide passage for dogs since they are the main means of controlling and driving animals on farms.

Around the turn of the 20th century, in some rural areas, barbed wire fences were used for local telephone networks.

=== Warfare and law enforcement ===
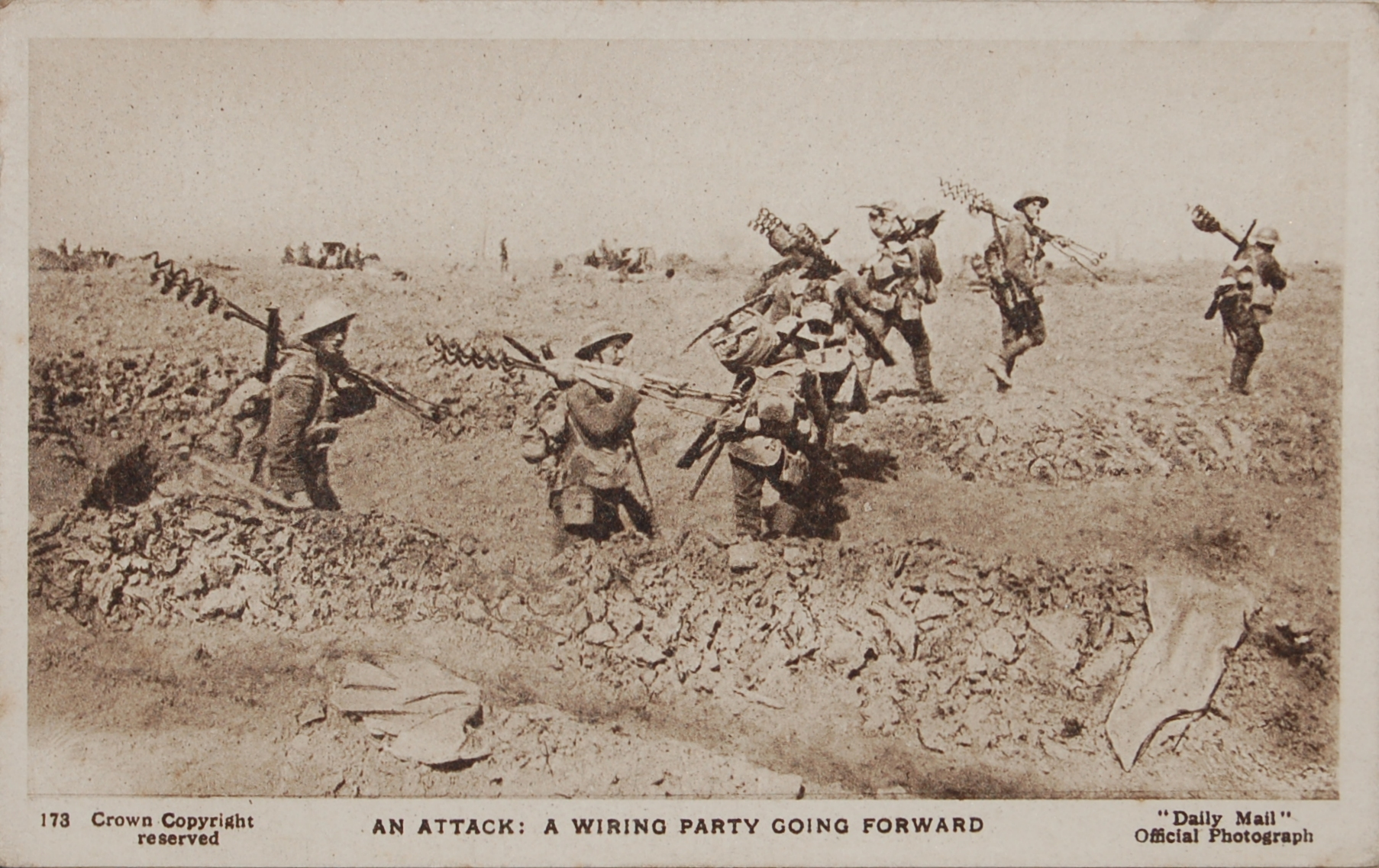
A wiring party deploying entanglements during World War I

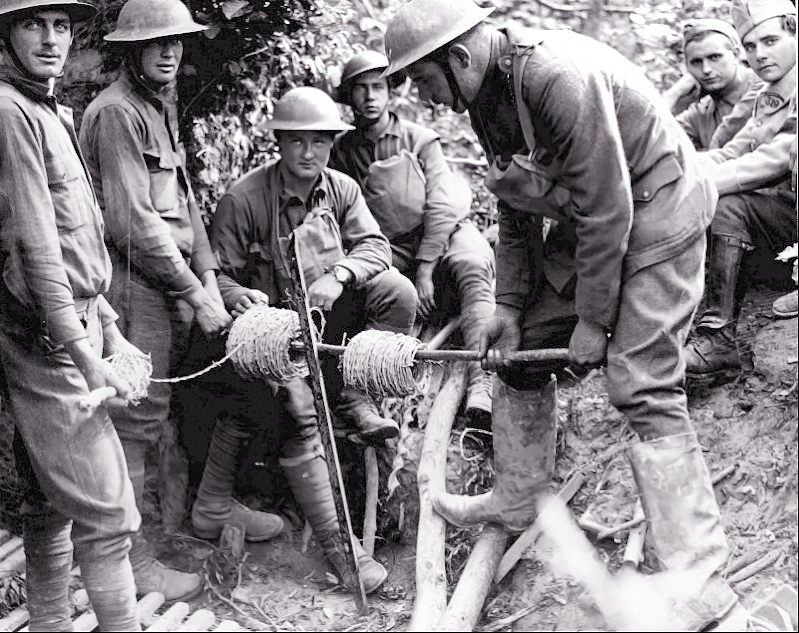
American soldiers during World War I laying barbed wire. June, 1918

Barbed wire was used for the first time by Portuguese troops defending from African tribes during the Battle of Magul in 1895. Less well known is its extensive usage in the Russo-Japanese War.

In 1899 barbed wire was also extensively used in the Boer War, where it played a strategic role bringing spaces under control, at military outposts as well as to hold the captured Boer population in concentration camps.

The government of the United States built its first international border fence from 1909 to 1911 along the California-Mexico border. It included barbed wire and was intended to keep cattle from moving between the two countries. In 1924, the United States created its border patrol, which built more barbed wire fences on the Mexican border; this time to prevent people from crossing.

More significantly, barbed wire was used extensively by all participating combatants in World War I to prevent movement, with deadly consequences. Barbed wire entanglements were placed in front of trenches to prevent direct charges on men below, increasingly leading to greater use of more advanced weapons such as high-powered machine guns and grenades. A feature of these entanglements was that the barbs were much closer together, often forming a continuous sequence. Barbed wire could be exposed to heavy bombardments because it could be easily replaced, and its structure included so much open space that machine guns rarely destroyed enough of it to defeat its purpose. However, barbed wire was defeated by the tank in 1916, as shown by the Allied breakthrough at Amiens through German lines on August 8, 1918.

One British writer described how the Germans used barbed wire as follows: The enemy wire was always deep, thick, and securely staked with iron supports, which were either crossed like the letter X, or upright, with loops to take the wire and shaped at one end like corkscrews so as to screw into the ground. The wire stood on these supports on a thick web, about four feet high and from thirty to forty feet across. The wire used was generally as thick as sailor's marline stuff, or two twisted rope yarns. It contained, as a rule, some sixteen barbs to the foot. The wire used in front of our lines was generally galvanized, and remained grey after months of exposure. The (German) wire, not being galvanized, rusted to a black color, and shows up black at a great distance.

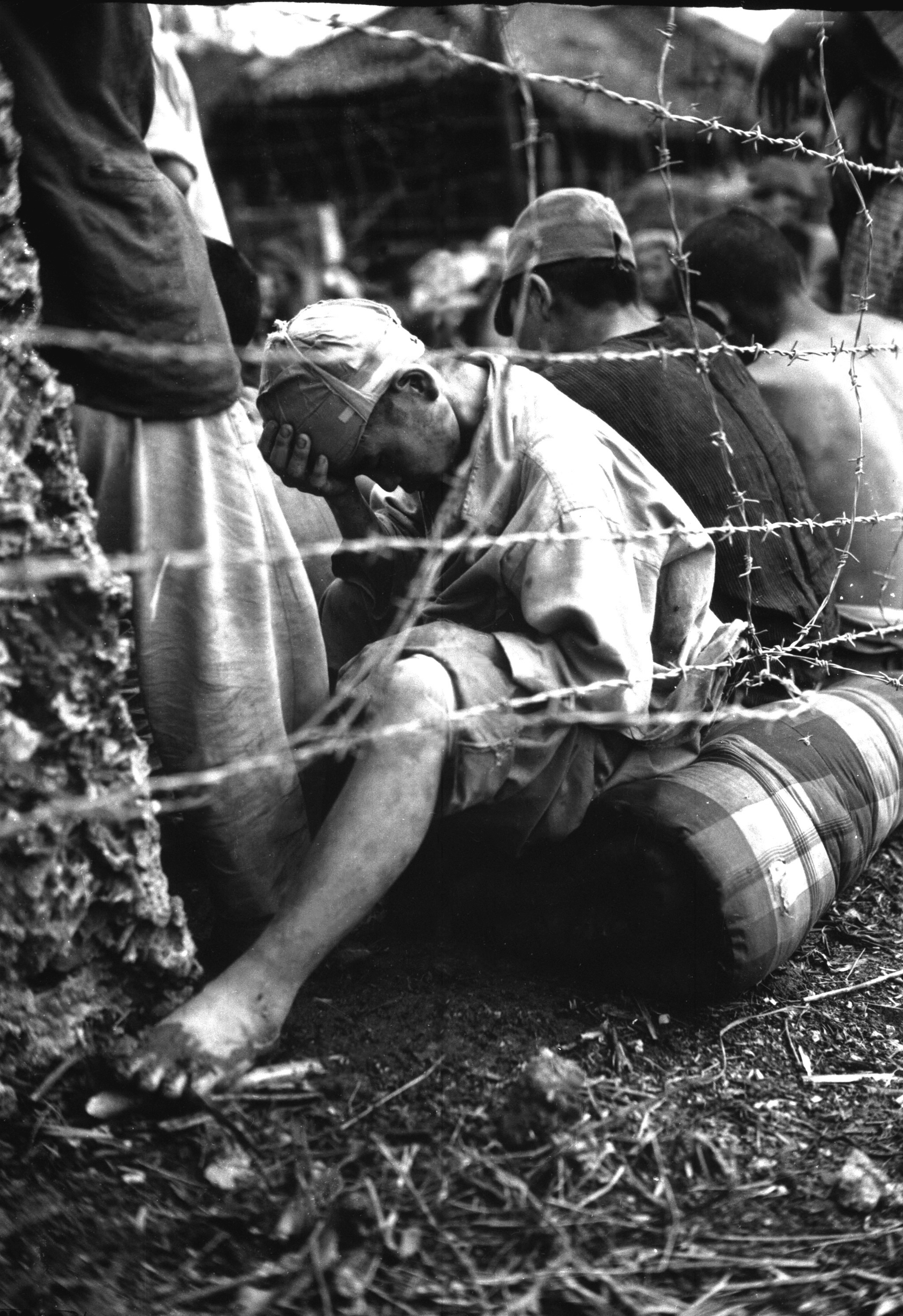
Barbed wire and containment: Japanese prisoner of war 1945

During the Great Depression, migratory work camps in the United States used barbed wire.

In the 1930s and 1940s Europe the Nazis used barbed wire in concentration camp and extermination camp architecture, where it usually surrounded the camp and was electrified to prevent escape. Barbed wire served the purpose of keeping prisoners contained.

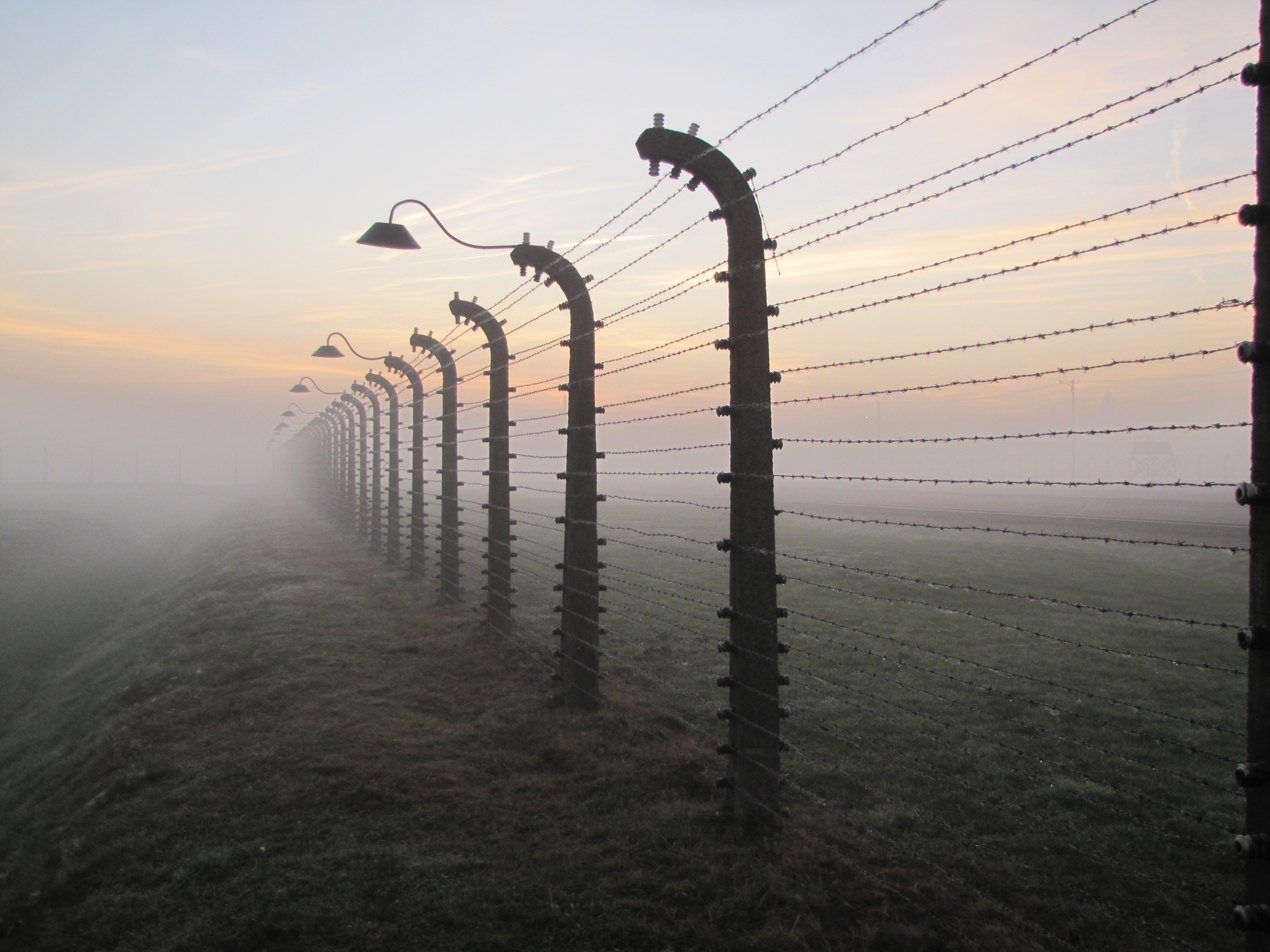
Auschwitz (Nazi Germany concentration camp) fence in Poland

Infirmaries in extermination camps like Auschwitz where prisoners were gassed or experimented on were often separated from other areas by electrified wire and were often braided with branches to prevent outsiders from knowing what was concealed behind their walls.

During the United States' World War II Internment of Japanese Americans, barbed wire was used to enclose the concentration camps, such as Manzanar.

During the 1968 Chicago riots, barbed wire was attached to the fronts of police and National Guard vehicles. The vehicles were used to drive into protesters and rioters and were nicknamed "Daly dozers" after then-Chicago mayor Richard J. Daley.

== Safety and injuries ==
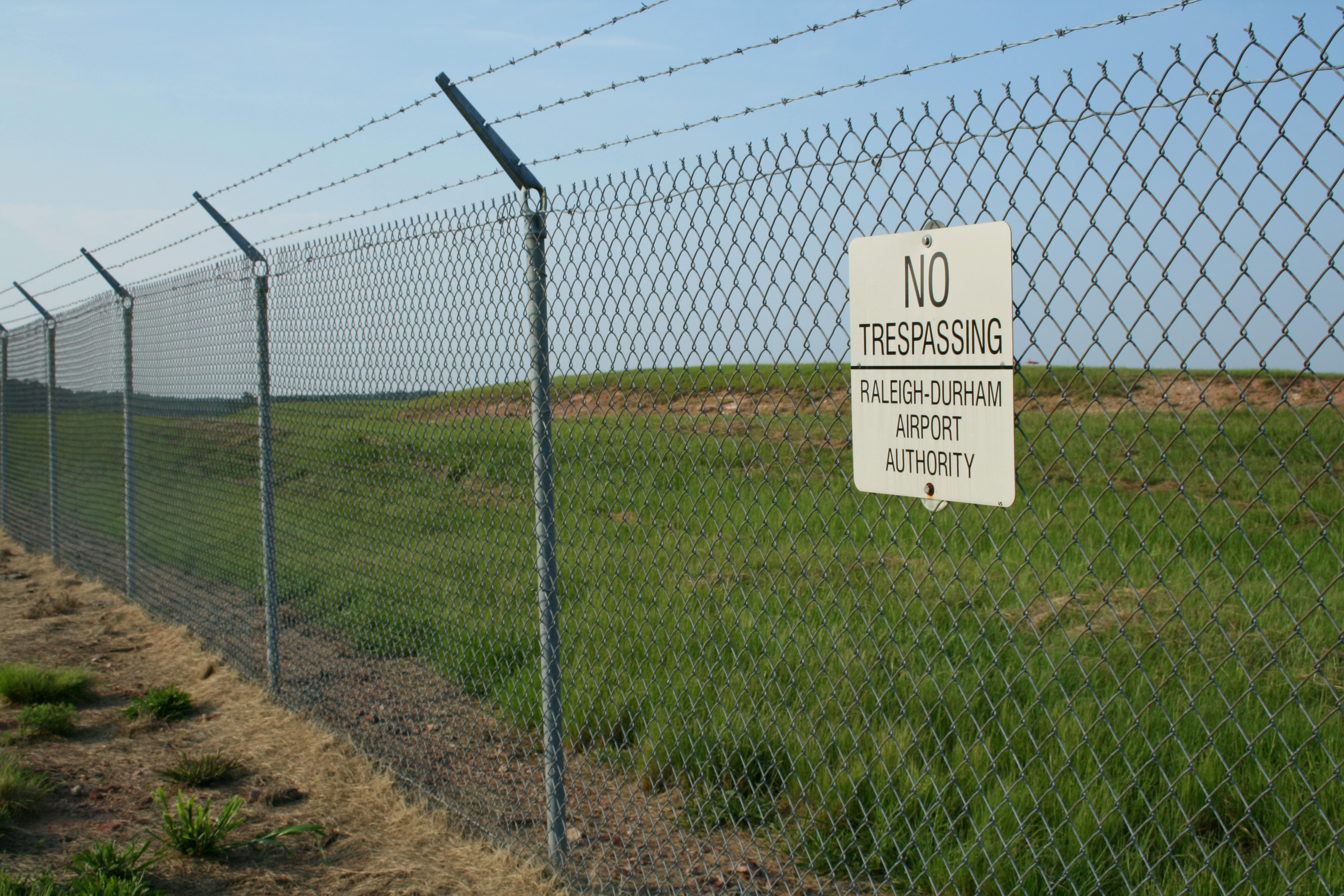
Chain link fence with barbed wire on top

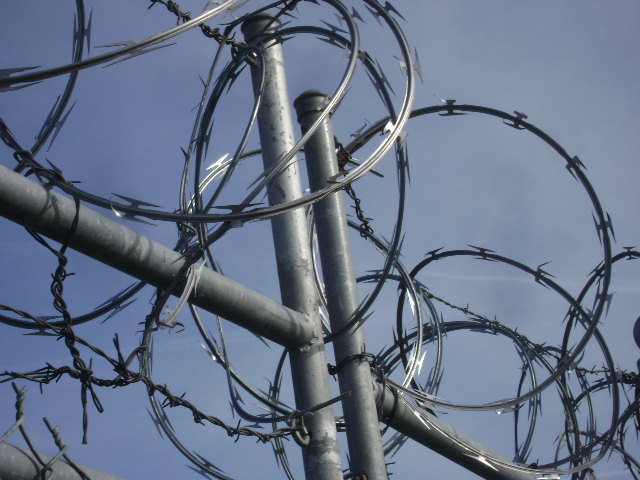
Razor wire is a curved variation of barbed wire.

Most barbed wire fences, while sufficient to discourage cattle, are passable by humans who can simply climb over or through the fence by stretching the gaps between the wires using non-barbed sections of the wire as handholds. To prevent humans crossing, many prisons, and other high-security installations construct fences with razor wire, a variant which replaces the barbs with near-continuous cutting surfaces sufficient to injure unprotected persons who climb on it. Both razor wire and barbed wire can be bypassed with protection, such as a thick carpet, or with the use of wire cutters.

A commonly seen alternative is the placement of a few strands of barbed wire at the top of a chain link fence. The limited mobility of someone climbing a fence makes passing conventional barbed wire more difficult. On some chain link fences, these strands are attached to a bracket tilted 45 degrees towards the intruder, further increasing the difficulty.

Barbed wire began to be widely used as an implement of war during World War I. Wire was placed either to impede or halt the passage of soldiers, or to channel them into narrow defiles in which small arms, particularly machine guns, and indirect fire could be used with greater effect as they attempted to pass. Artillery bombardments on the Western Front became increasingly aimed at cutting the barbed wire that was a major component of trench warfare, particularly once new "wire-cutting" fuzes were introduced midway through the war.

As the war progressed, the wire was used in shorter lengths that were easier to transport and more difficult to cut with artillery. Other inventions were also a result of the war, such as the screw picket, which enabled construction of wire obstacles to be done at night in No Man's Land without the necessity of hammering stakes into the ground and drawing attention from the enemy.

During the Soviet–Afghan War, the accommodation of Afghan refugees into Pakistan was controlled in Pakistan's largest province, Balochistan, under General Rahimuddin Khan, by making the refugees stay for controlled durations in barbed wire camps (see Controlling Soviet–Afghan war refugees).

The frequent use of barbed wire on prison walls, around concentration camps, and the like, has made it symbolic of oppression and denial of freedom in general. For example, in Germany, the totality of East Germany's border regime is commonly referred to with the short phrase "Mauer und Stacheldraht" (that is, "wall and barbed wire"), and Amnesty International has a barbed wire in their symbol.

Movement against barbed wire can result in moderate to severe injuries to the skin and, depending on body area and barbed wire configuration, possibly to the underlying tissue. Humans can manage not to injure themselves excessively when dealing with barbed wire as long as they are cautious. Restriction of movement, appropriate clothing, and slow movement when close to barbed wire aid in reducing injury.

Infantrymen are often trained and inured to the injuries caused by barbed wire. Several soldiers can lie across the wire to form a bridge for the rest of the formation to pass over; often any injury thus incurred is due to the tread of those passing over and not to the wire itself.

Injuries caused by barbed wire are typically seen in horses, bats, or birds. Horses panic easily, and once caught in barbed wire, large patches of skin may be torn off. At best, such injuries may heal, but they may cause disability or death (particularly due to infection). Birds or bats may not be able to perceive thin strands of barbed wire and suffer injuries.

For this reason, horse fences may have rubber bands nailed parallel to the wires. More than 60 different species of wildlife have been reported in Australia as victims of entanglement on barbed wire fences, and the wildlife friendly fencing project is beginning to address this problem. Grazing animals with slow movements that will back off at the first notion of pain (e.g., sheep and cows) will not generally suffer the severe injuries often seen in other animals.

Barbed wire has been reported as a tool for human torture. It is also frequently used as a weapon in hardcore professional wrestling matches, often as a covering for another type of weapon—Mick Foley was infamous for using a baseball bat wrapped in barbed wire—and infrequently as a covering of or substitute for the ring ropes.

Because of the risk of injuries, in 2010 Norway prohibited making new fences with barbed wire for limiting migration of animals. Electric fences are used instead. Consequently, automotive brands such as Bentley and Rolls-Royce Motor Cars use Norwegian (and other Northern European region) hides for producing leather interior in their cars, since the hides from Norwegian cattle have fewer scratches than hides from countries where barbed wire is used.

== See also ==
- Bangalore torpedo
- Barbed Wire Act 1893
- Concertina wire
- Isaac L. Ellwood
- Jacob Haish
- Kansas Barbed Wire Museum
- Razor wire
- Wire obstacle

== References and further reading ==
- Bennett, Lyn Ellen, and Scott Abbott. The Perfect Fence: Untangling the Meanings of Barbed Wire (Texas A&M University Press, 2017).
- Krell, Alan (2002). The Devil's Rope: A Cultural History of Barbed Wire. London: Reaktion Books. ISBN 978-1861891440. OCLC 50494711.
- McCallum, Henry D. & Frances T. (1965). The Wire that Fenced the West. Norman: University of Oklahoma Press., LoC:65-11234
- Netz, Reviel (2004). Barbed wire. An ecology of modernity. Wesleyan University Press. ISBN 978-0-8195-6719-2.
- Razac, Olivier (2003). Barbed Wire: A Political History. W. W. Norton & Company. ISBN 978-1-56584-812-2.
- Biography of John W. Gates, barbed wire promoter who monopolized the industry with the American Steel and Wire Company, accessed March 29, 2006
