= Picket (military) =

Soldier or small unit tasked with early warning and screening for larger forces

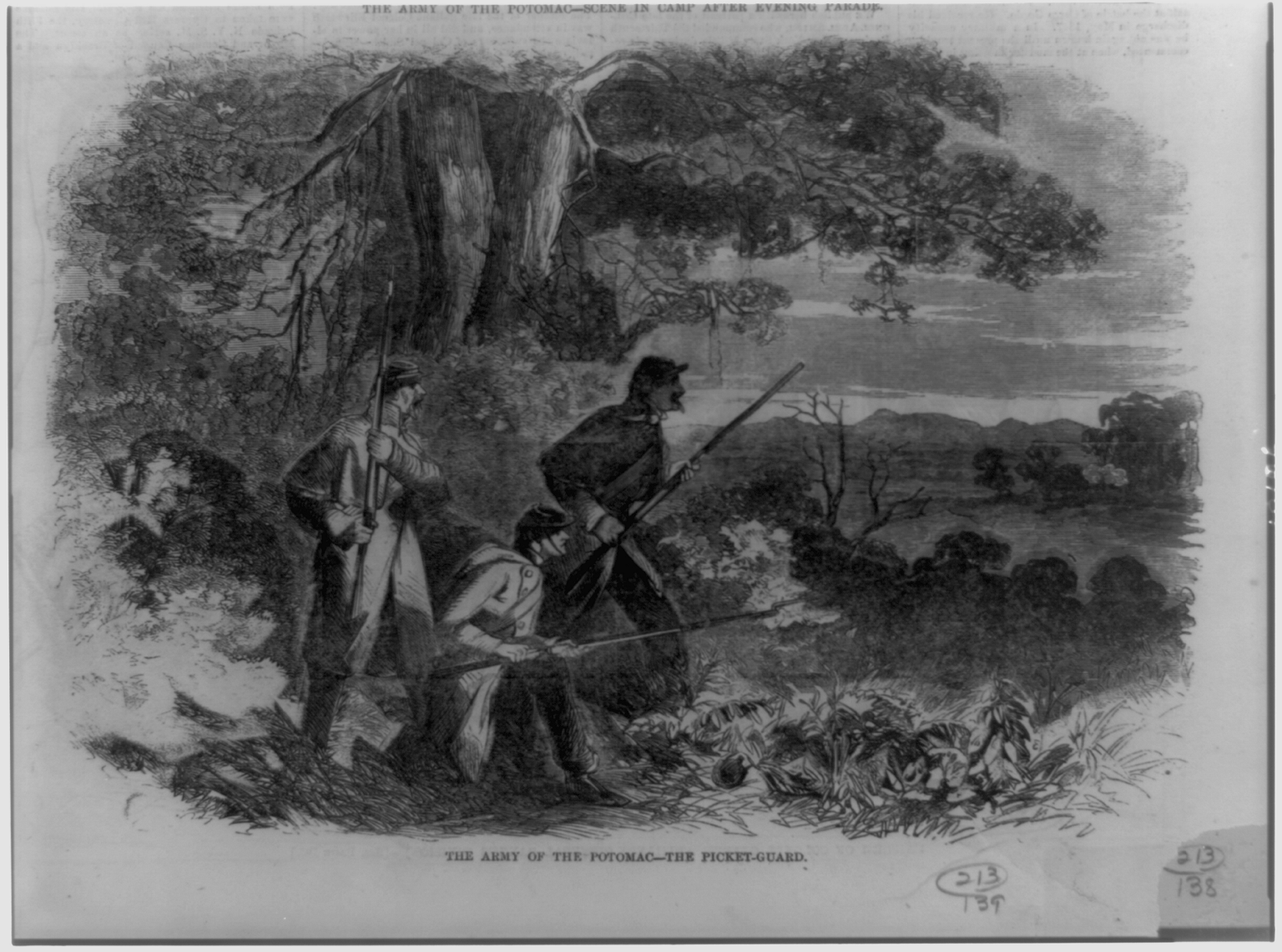
1861 illustration of an Army of the Potomac picket guard

A picket (archaically, picquet [variant form piquet]) is a soldier, or small unit of soldiers, placed on a defensive line forward of a friendly position to provide timely warning and screening against an enemy advance. It can also refer to any unit (e.g. a scout vehicle, surveillance aircraft or patrol ship) performing a similar function. A picket guarding a fixed position may be known as a sentry or guard.

== Origins ==
Picket (Fr. piquet, a pointed stake or peg, from piquer, 'to point or pierce'), is thought to have originated in the French Army around 1690, from the circumstance that an infantry company on outpost duty dispersed its musketeers to watch, with a small group of pikemen called piquet remaining in reserve. It was in use in the British Army before 1735 and probably much earlier.

== Usage ==
Picket now refers to a unit (either naval or army) maintaining a watch. This may mean a watch for the enemy, or other types of watch e.g. fire picket. This can be likened to the art of sentry keeping.

A staggered picket consists of, for example, two soldiers where one soldier is relieved at a time. This is so that on any given picket one soldier is fresh, having just started the picket, while the other is ready to be relieved. Although each soldier is required to maintain watch for the full duration of a shift, halfway through each shift a new soldier is put on watch.

Historically it was used extensively in Zachary Taylor's army during the Mexican-American War, as described by Samuel Chamberlain.

== See also ==
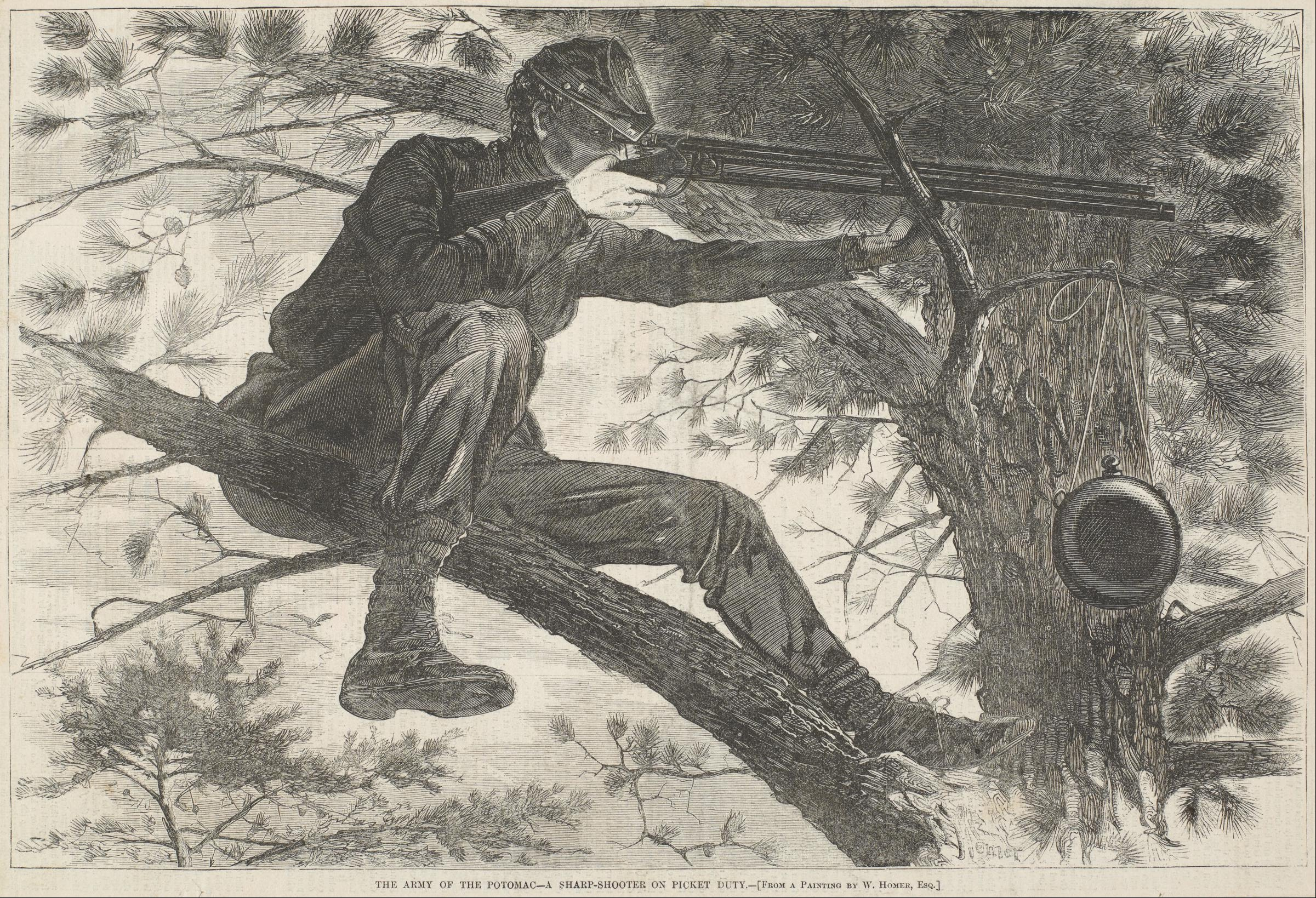
The Army of the Potomac—A Sharpshooter on Picket Duty, by Winslow Homer, 1862

- Picket boat, small naval launch, used for patrolling harbour defences
- Radar picket
- Screening (tactic)
- Screw picket
- Skirmisher
- Point man
- Vedette (sentry), a mounted sentry or outpost
