= Abu Hishma =

Town in Iraq

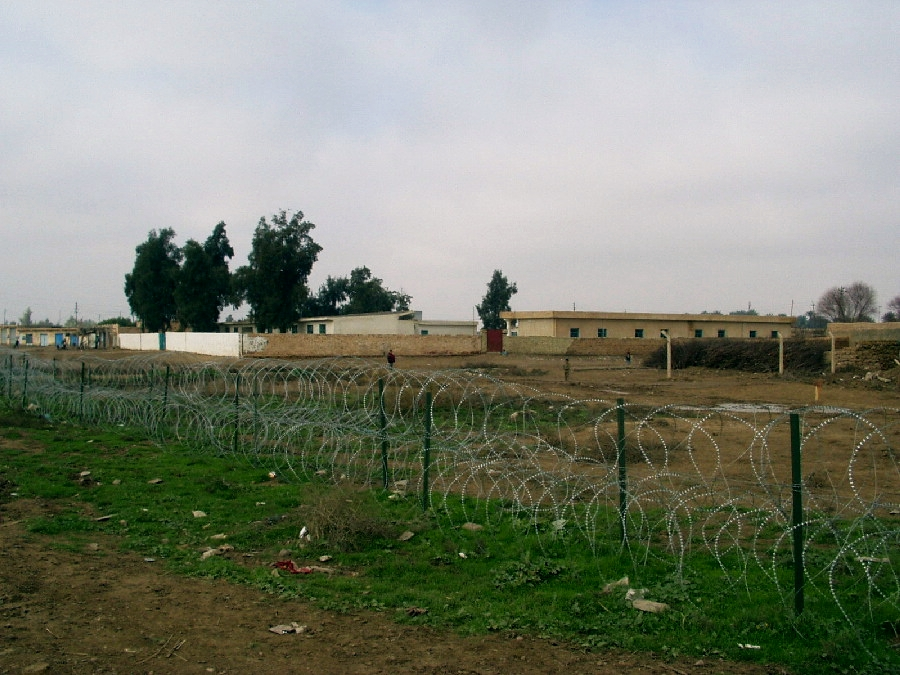
Abu Hishma, with razor wire fence

Abu Hishma (Arabic: أبو هشمة) is a small Iraqi town, with a population of approximately 7,000.

== Iraq War ==
During the Invasion of Iraq, the orchards outside the village were the site of a number of mortar launches, and on November 17, 2003, Staff Sgt. Dale Panchot was killed when his Bradley vehicle was hit by an RPG.

Immediately following the attack, the 4th Infantry Division encased the entire village in Concertina wire, and began hunting for those responsible. The following day, a 500 lb bomb was dropped on the house that had sheltered the attackers, and eight sheikhs, the police chief, city council and police chief were all arrested by American forces. The US Forces, led by Lt. Col. Nathan Sassaman of the 3rd Brigade Combat Team, issued villagers English-language ID cards that identified them by number, their age and what type of vehicle they drove. This led critics to decry the collective punishment, a tactic forbidden by the 33rd Article of the Fourth Geneva Convention.

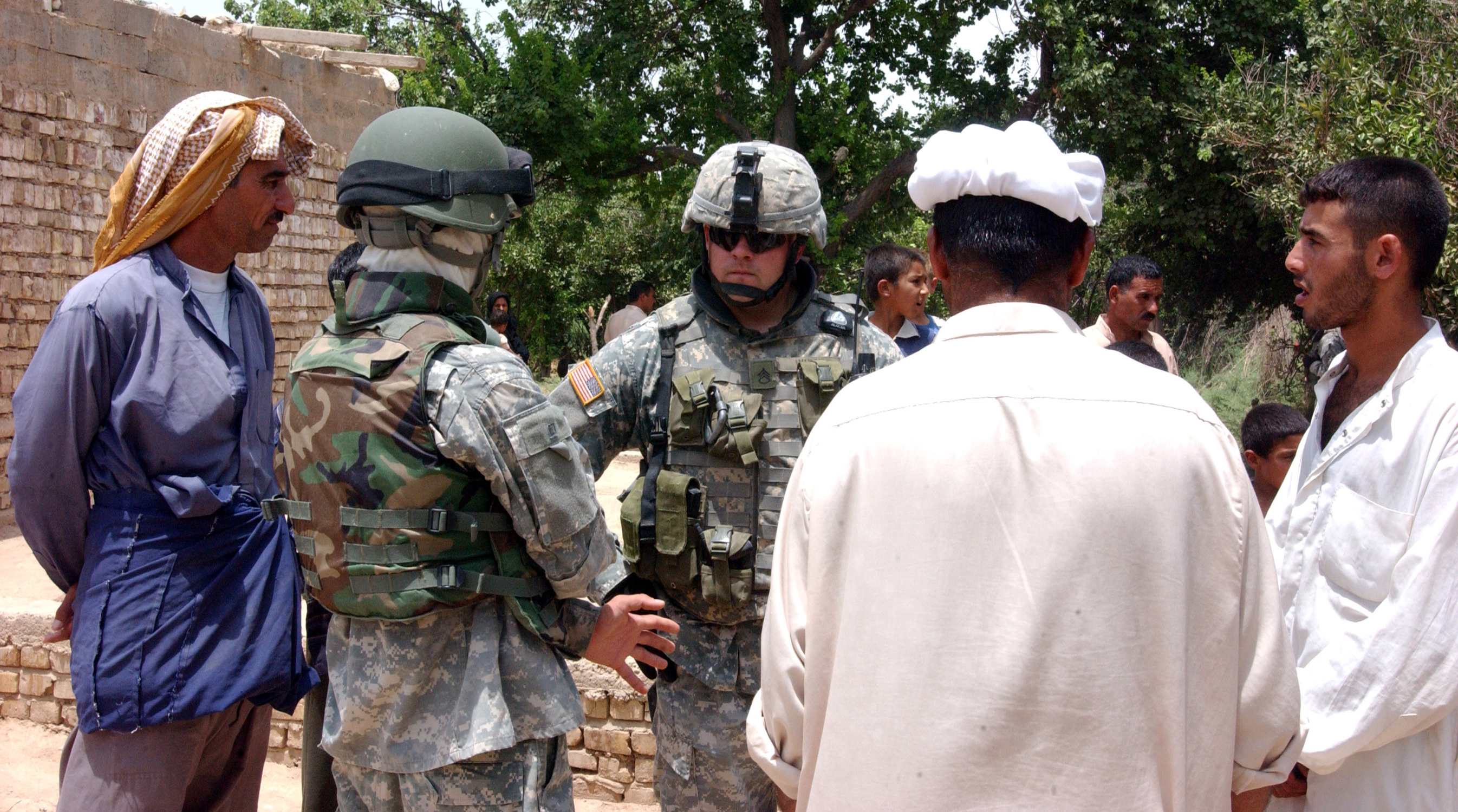
S.Sgt. White speaks with the father of the killed girl

On July 2, 2006, insurgent mortars landed in the yard of an Abu Hishma home, near 4th Infantry Division troops, killing a local girl picking tomatoes. The event made military headlines, as Staff Sgt. Donald White vowed to find those responsible. Army reports contradicted whether the mortars had been launched from the girl's yard and misfired or had landed in her yard when distant insurgents had been targeting the nearby LSA Anaconda.

On December 3, 2006 - Spc. Kenneth W. Haines was killed when an IED exploded, damaging his vehicle, in the village.

In 2010 2-11 Field Artillery assumed command of the region. Mortars were constantly being launched toward JBB. Bravo Battery was responding to a QRF mission when the platoon came under contact. 2nd Platoon with the help of the Iraqi Army captured the three individuals who were responsible for a larger terror organization. 2nd Platoon came into contact from enemy fire several times during their deployment from the small town. A gunner is said to have taken sniper fire into his gunner hatch.
