= Concertina wire =

Type of barbed wire

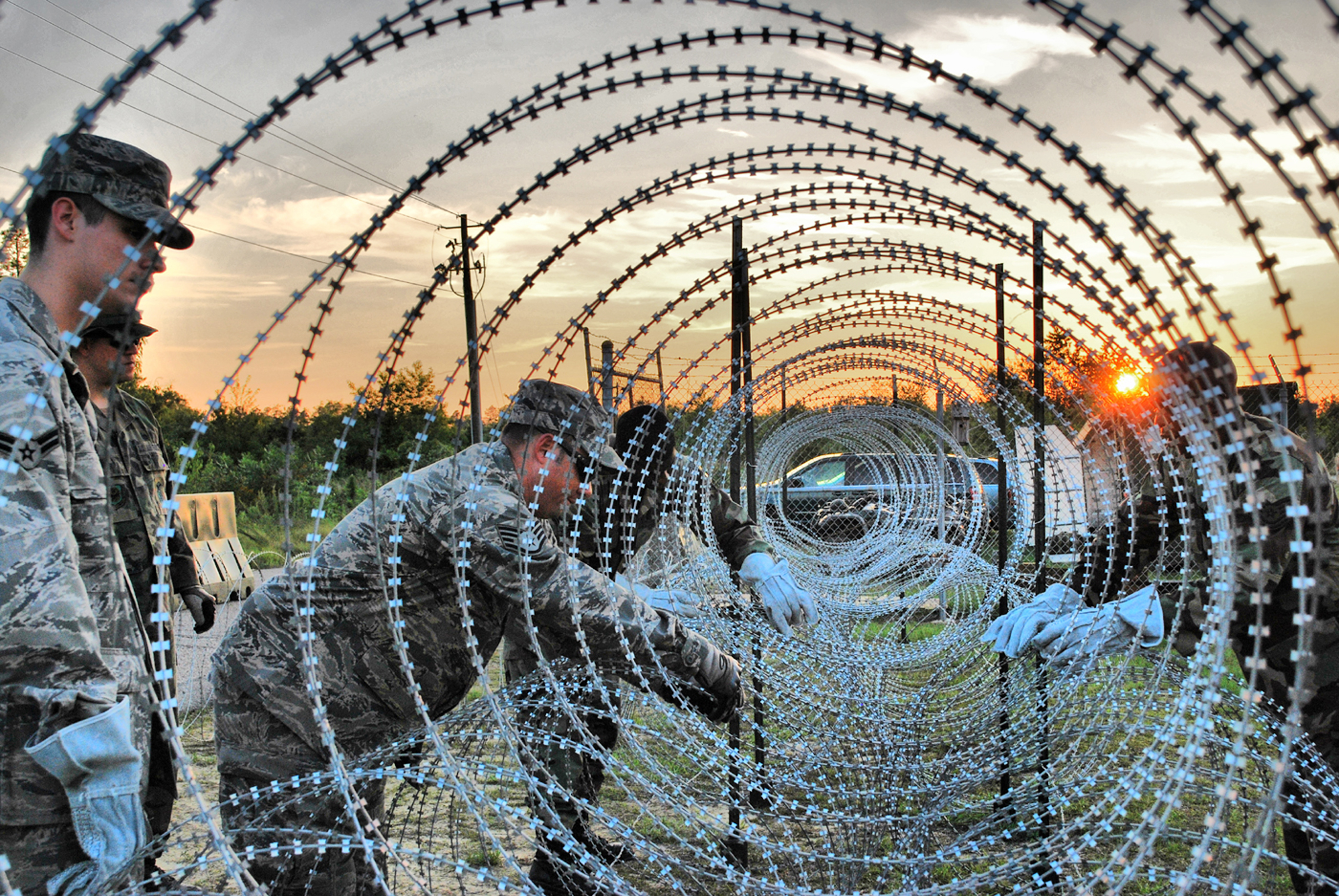
Triple concertina wire fence

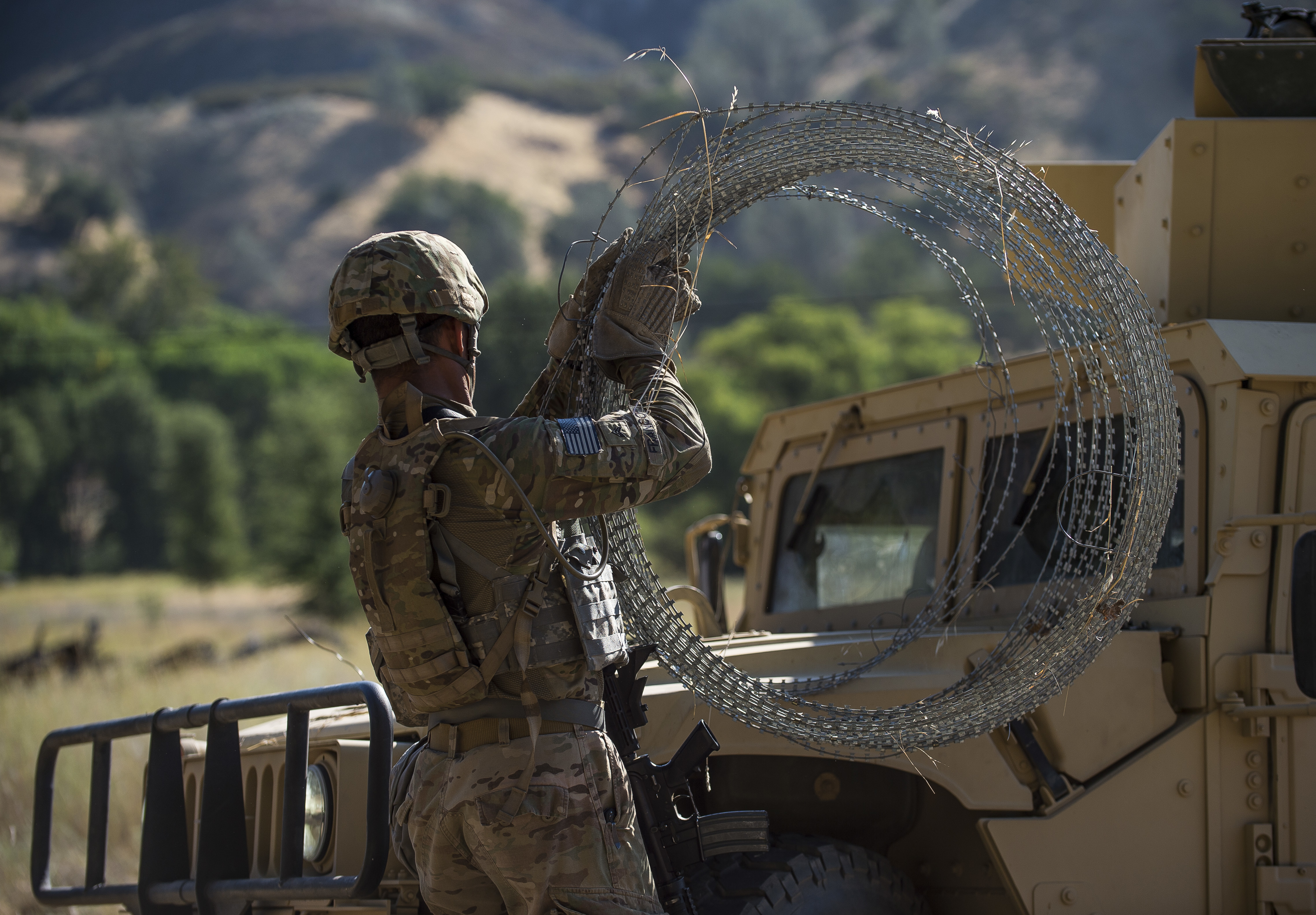
Baled concertina wire prior to deployment

Concertina wire or Dannert wire is a type of barbed wire or razor wire that is formed in large coils which can be expanded like a concertina. In conjunction with plain barbed wire (and/or razor wire/tape) and steel pickets, it is most often used to form military-style wire obstacles. It is also used in non-military settings, such as when used in prison barriers, detention camps, riot control, or at international borders. During World War I, soldiers manufactured concertina wire themselves, using ordinary barbed wire. Today, it is factory made.

== Origins ==
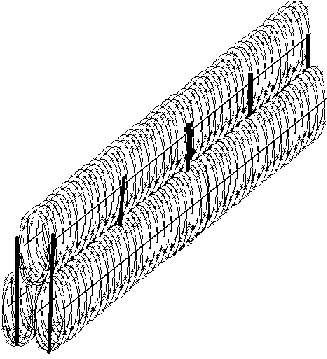
A sketch of a typical concertina wire obstacle

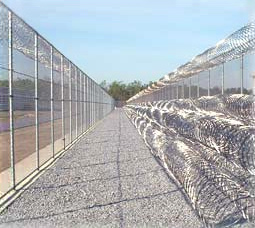
Concertina wire can be a feature of prisons.

In World War I, barbed wire obstacles were made by stretching lengths of barbed wire between stakes of wood or iron. At its simplest, such a barrier would resemble a fence as might be used for agricultural purposes. The double apron fence comprised a line of pickets with wires running diagonally down to points on the ground either side of the fence. Horizontal wires were attached to these diagonals.

More elaborate and formidable obstructions could be formed with multiple lines of stakes connected with wire running from side-to-side, back-to-front, and diagonally in many directions. Effective as these obstacles were, their construction took considerable time.

Barbed wire obstacles were vulnerable to being pushed about by artillery shells; in World War I, this frequently resulted in a mass of randomly entangled wires that could be even more daunting than a carefully constructed obstacle. Learning this lesson, World War I soldiers would deploy barbed wire in so-called concertinas that were relatively loose. Barbed wire concertinas could be prepared in the trenches and then deployed in no-man's-land relatively quickly under cover of darkness.

There was what might be called a concertina craze on: innumerable coils of barbed wire were converted into concertinas by the simple process of winding them round and round seven upright stakes in the ground; every new lap of wire was fastened to the one below it at every other stake by a twist of plain wire; the result, when you came to the end of a coil and lifted the whole up off the stakes was heavy ring of barbed wire that concertina'd out into ten-yard lengths.

Concertina wire packs flat for ease of transport and can then be deployed as an obstacle much more quickly than ordinary barbed wire, since the flattened coil of wire can easily be stretched out, forming an instant obstacle that will at least slow enemy passage. Several such coils with a few stakes to secure them in place are just as effective as an ordinary barbed wire fence, which must be built by driving stakes and running multiple wires between them.

A platoon of soldiers can deploy a single concertina fence at a rate of about a kilometre (5/8 mile) per hour. Such an obstacle is not very effective by itself (although it will still hinder an enemy advance under the guns of the defenders), and concertinas are normally built up into more elaborate patterns as time permits.

Today, concertina wire is factory made and is available in forms that can be deployed very rapidly from the back of a vehicle or trailer.

== Dannert wire ==
Oil-tempered barbed wire was developed during World War I; it was much harder to cut than ordinary barbed wire. During the 1930s, German Horst Dannert developed concertina wire of this high-grade steel wire. The result was entirely self-supporting; it did not require any vertical posts. An individual Dannert wire concertina could be compressed into a compact coil that could be carried by one man and then stretched out along its axis to make a barrier 50 feet (15 m) long and each coil could be held in place with just three staples hammered into the ground.

Dannert wire was imported into Britain from Germany before World War II. During the invasion crisis of 1940–1941, the demand for Dannert wire was so great that some was produced with low manganese steel wire which was easier to cut. This material was known as "Yellow Dannert" after the identifying yellow paint on the concertina handles. To compensate for the reduced effectiveness of Yellow Dannert, an extra supply of pickets were issued in lieu of screw pickets.

== Triple concertina wire ==
A barrier known as a triple concertina wire fence consists of two parallel concertinas joined by twists of wire and topped by a third concertina similarly attached. The result is an extremely effective barrier with many of the desirable properties of a random entanglement. A triple concertina fence could be deployed very quickly: it is possible for a party of five to deploy 50 yards (46 m) of triple concertina fence in just 15 minutes. Optionally, triple concertina fence could be strengthened with uprights, but this increases the construction time significantly.

== "Constantine" wire ==
Concertina wire is sometimes mistakenly called "constantine" wire. Constantine probably came from a corruption/misunderstanding of concertina and led to confusion with the Roman Emperor Constantine. This, in turn, has led to some people trying to differentiate between concertina wire and constantine wire by assigning the term constantine wire to what is commonly known as razor wire. In contrast to the helical construction of concertina wire, razor wire consists of a single wire with teeth that project periodically along its length.

== See also ==
- Slinky
