= The Wire that Fenced the West =

- Front cover of The Wire that Fenced the West, 1965 edition.
- Author: Henry D. McCallum and Frances T. McCallum
- Language: English
- Subject: History and the development of barbed wire and the inventors
- Publisher: University of Oklahoma Press
- Publication date: 1965
- Publication place: United States
- Pages: 285
- ISBN: 0806106514

The Wire that Fenced the West is a book written by Henry D. and Frances T. McCallum and published in 1965 by the University of Oklahoma Press.

The book covers the history of the development of barbed wire and the inventors. It also include chapters of how it was marketed and the history of its use in the American West. It includes an illustrated identification guide showing the various brands, styles, and patents.

== About the authors ==
Henry D. McCallum and his wife Frances T. McCallum wrote the book based on the hobby of Henry D. McCallum. McCallum started his collection when he was an oil geologist. When he would inspect in fields, he would notice the fences and recognize the variety of fence styles. He took home a sample and from there his collection grew to a massive size with more than a hundred different kinds of barbed wire.

== Chapters ==
I. Barbed-Wire Fence-Makers

1. Threshold of Promise
2. Prelude to 1874
3. Incident at De Kalb
4. "Prior-Use" Fences
5. Promoting Barbed Wire
6. Moonshine and Monopoly
7. Patent Litigation
8. Barbed-Wire Barons

II. Barbed-Wire Fence-Builders

9. "This Cockeyed World of Cattle Fold"
10. "The Big Die-up"
11. "King of the Coasters" and Brother Jon
12. "Startin' in to Play H--- with Texas"
13. "Improvements" on the Public Domain
14. "Trail to Rail"
15. "Alambre! Alambre! Alambre!"
16. A Nineteenth-Century Allegory
III. Types of Barbed Wire
17. Modern Trends
18. Classification
19. Identification

== Reception ==
The book is one of a narrative monologue that is accredited with exceptional writing and regarded as an excellent reading. Some historians find that the work is not reliable for a reading of exact history. This is due to the secondary sources the author uses instead of any primary sources, and it is mentioned that those used are insufficient. Some critiques of the book find that McCallum used some credible sources such as court records, manuscript records of wire companies, family papers, and memoirs of leading figures of the field. The book lacks key elements of discussion such as enclosure practices and fencing laws, as well as economic and social responses and results to the barbed wire. Another issue a critic had was the lack of talk between barbed wire fences and the railroad industry.

== Editions ==
- Norman: University of Oklahoma Press, 1965. LC: 65-11234.
