= Picket line =

Rope used to tether horses

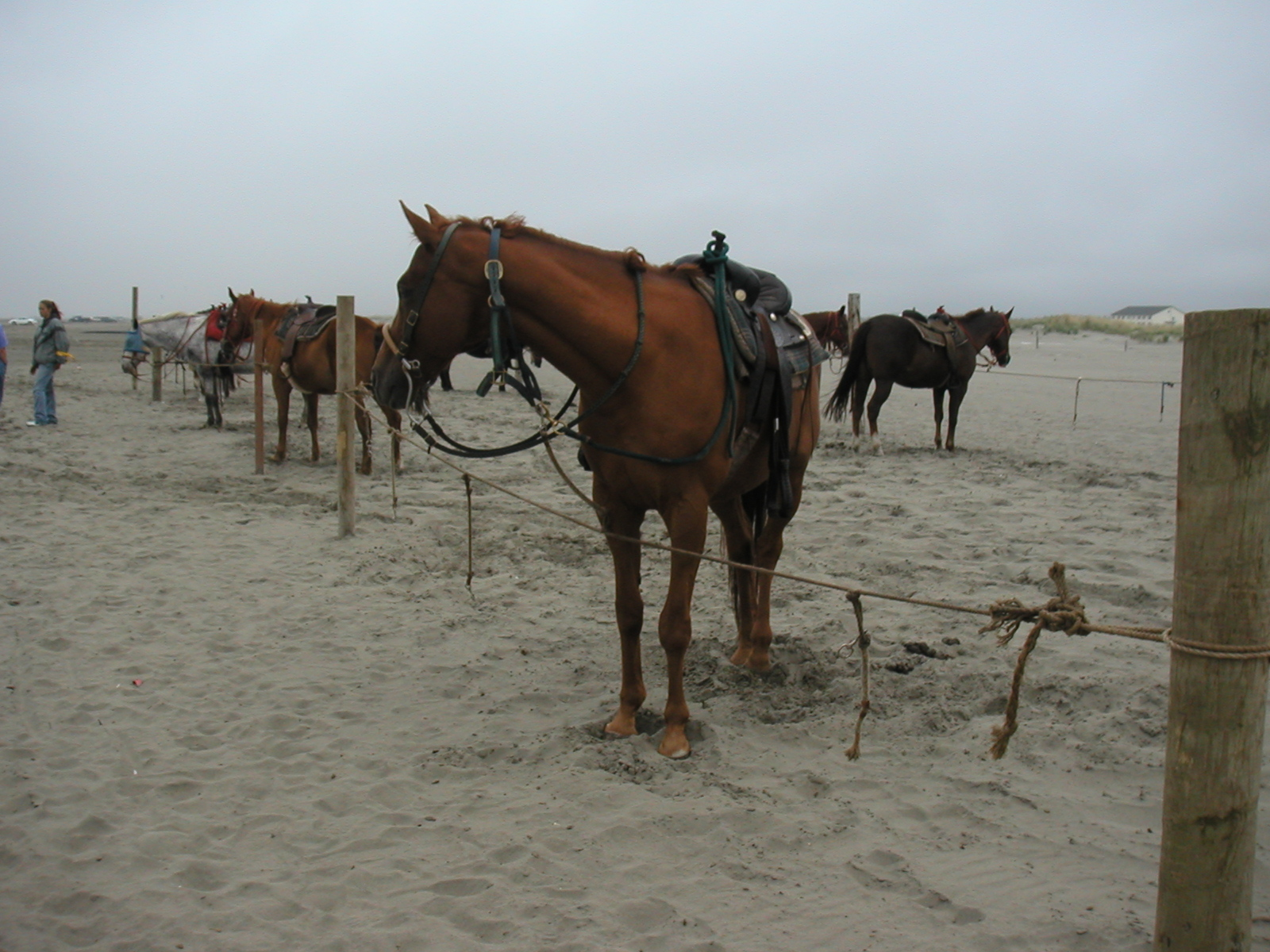
Horses tied on chest-height picket lines

A picket line is a horizontal rope along which horses are tied at intervals. The rope can be on the ground, at chest height (above the knees, below the neck) or overhead. The overhead form is usually called a high line.

A variant of a high line, used to tie a single horse, is a horizontal pole attached high on the side of a horse trailer. The attachment is designed so that the pole can be removed or folded against the trailer when not in use.

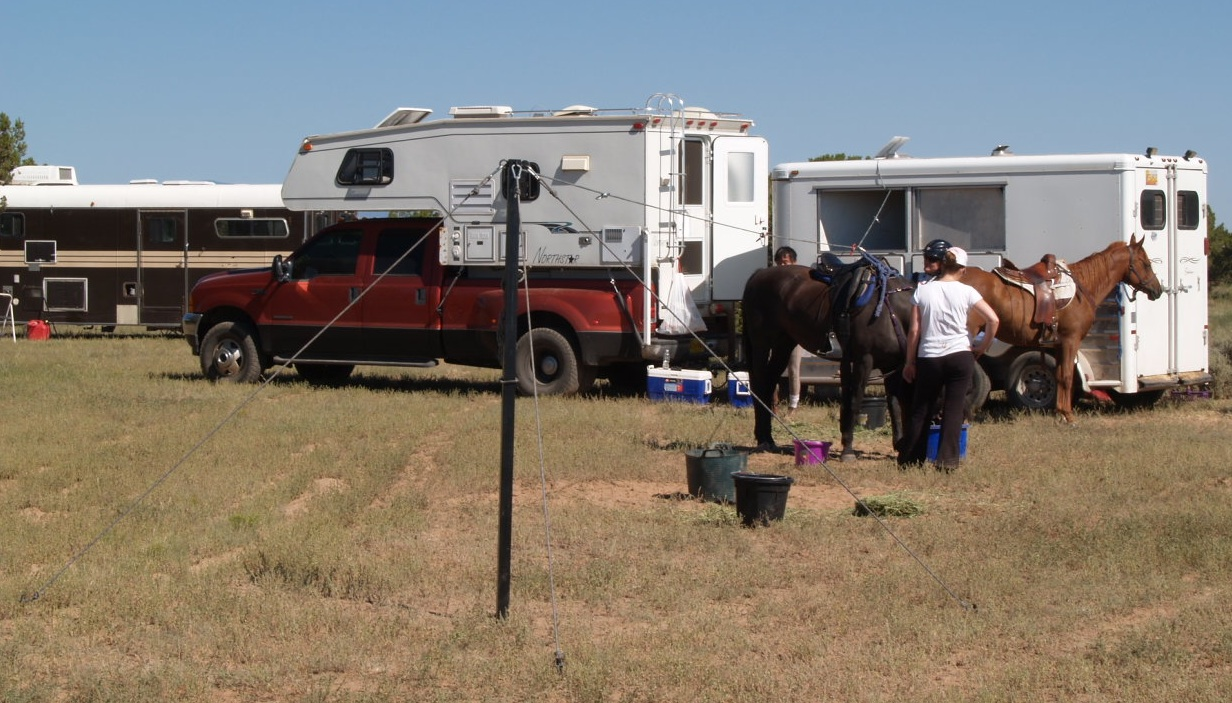
Horse tied on a high line

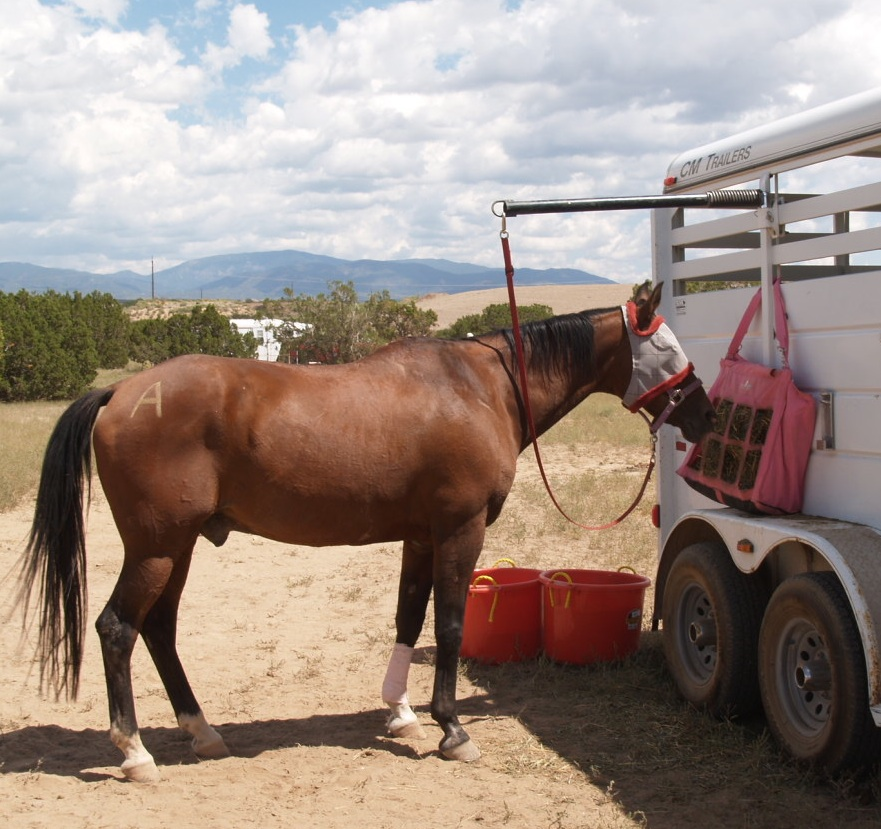
Horse tied to an overhead pole on a trailer

== Picket pin ==
The word picket (meaning sharp point) in this context refers to one of the pins that are used to secure the line. Picket pins were originally pointed wooden stakes hammered in to the ground. A more modern type of picket pin is the screw picket. These devices are metal bars twisted into a corkscrew shape. They are screwed in to the ground rather than hammered, and are not pulled out so easily as stakes. To secure a single horse, only a single picket pin is needed to which the horse is attached via a length of rope attached to a hobble on one leg.

In forested areas, a picket line can be erected without the use of picket pins by stringing the line between two trees. It is considered good practice to place sacking between the tree and the rope in order to protect the tree from damage.
