= Wiring party =

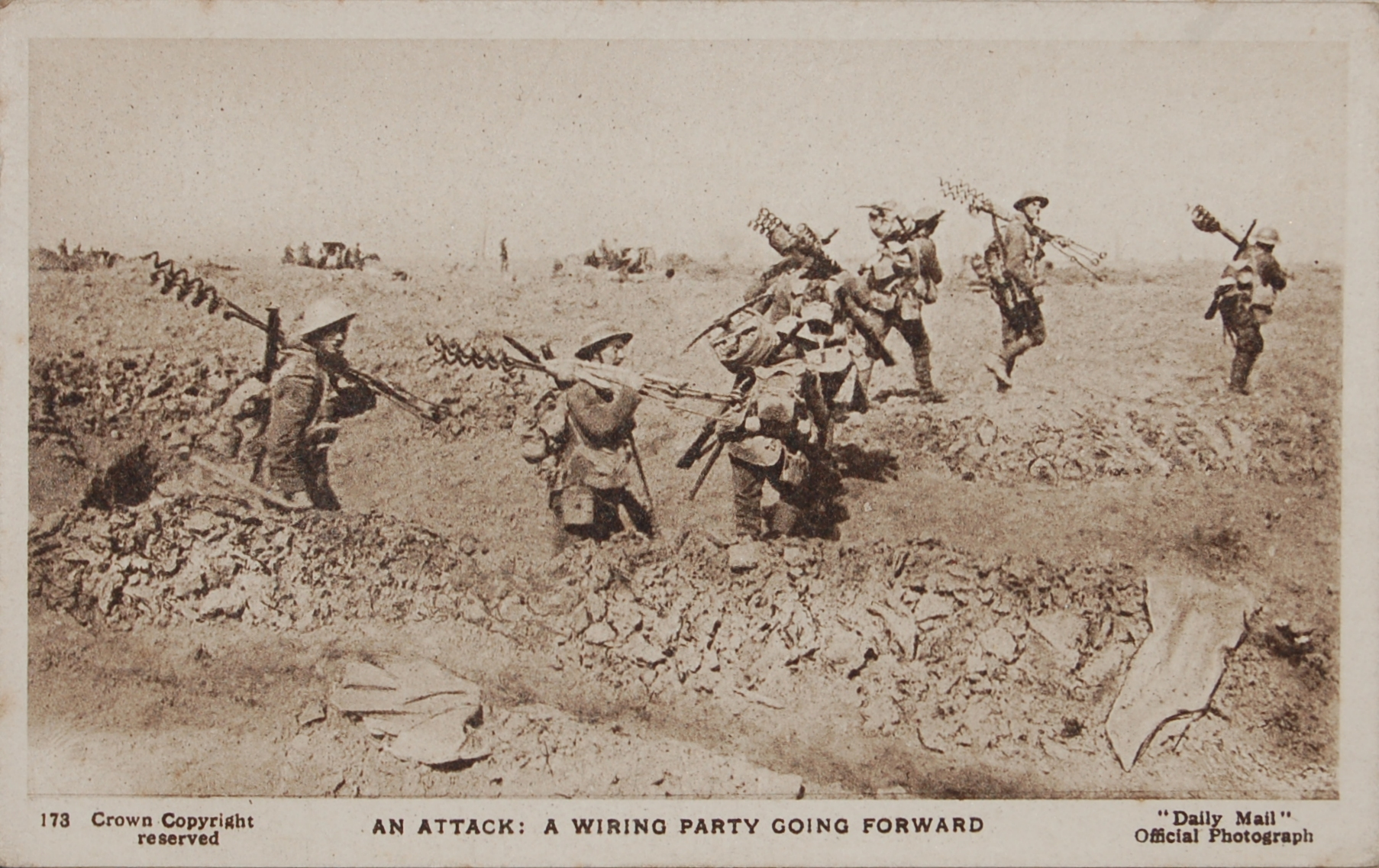
British wiring party with screw pickets

Wiring parties (or wiring sappers, cutters) were used during World War I on the Western Front as an offensive countermeasure against the enemy’s barbed wire obstacles. Though hazardous and stressful duty, work was done at night to repair, improve, and rebuild their own wire defences, while also sabotaging and cutting the enemy's. In battles all across the Western Front, cutting parties were successful in creating breaches in the wire lines, offering their comrades a better chance to cross no man's land.

Barbed wire was one of the attacker's great problems. There were cutters, but not enough, and men were often killed before they could cut a way.

== New technology ==
The outbreak of World War I led to a revolution in modern warfare, and the use of barbed wire on the battlefield was one of the many technologies relied upon to hamper the enemy's attack. Used by American cattle ranchers since the 1870s, barbed wire was adapted on the Western Front to serve a more gruesome purpose than containing livestock. Transformed into a weapon of war, it was shaped to create deadly obstacles in the path of assaulting enemy troops. Meant to trap, maim, and make easy targets of the opponent, they ranged from a single strand of wire arranged to trip men in the dark, to a 150-metre-long construction 30 ft wide (9.1 m) and 5 or 6 ft (1.5 or 1.8 m) tall By spring of 1915, barbed wire entanglements were an unavoidable element in trench warfare, and posed a serious threat to all men going 'over the top'.

== The call of duty ==
The integration of barbed wire as an instrument of war required the formation of tactical teams, or wiring parties. Barbed wire defences needed to be maintained frequently, as shrapnel often cut the wire, or the enemy had sabotaged it during battle or the night before. Workers did not just deal with the actual wire; they also had to clear the entanglements of any bodies or body parts. Under the cover of darkness, often one-third of units stealthily climbed out of the trenches to perform maintenance on their wires, as well as investigating the status of the enemy's. They were charged with the task of repairing damaged wire and reconstructing the line if necessary. In addition, these working parties attempted to cut and destroy the enemy’s wire in the hopes of preventing their troops from being stopped in the middle of no man's land during the next attack. From as early as 9pm and as late as 3am, they were like "so many animals, working during the night and sleeping by day". As the war progressed, it seemed to become 'regular routine', but often one of the most deadly and difficult duties to perform.

== Equipment and methods ==
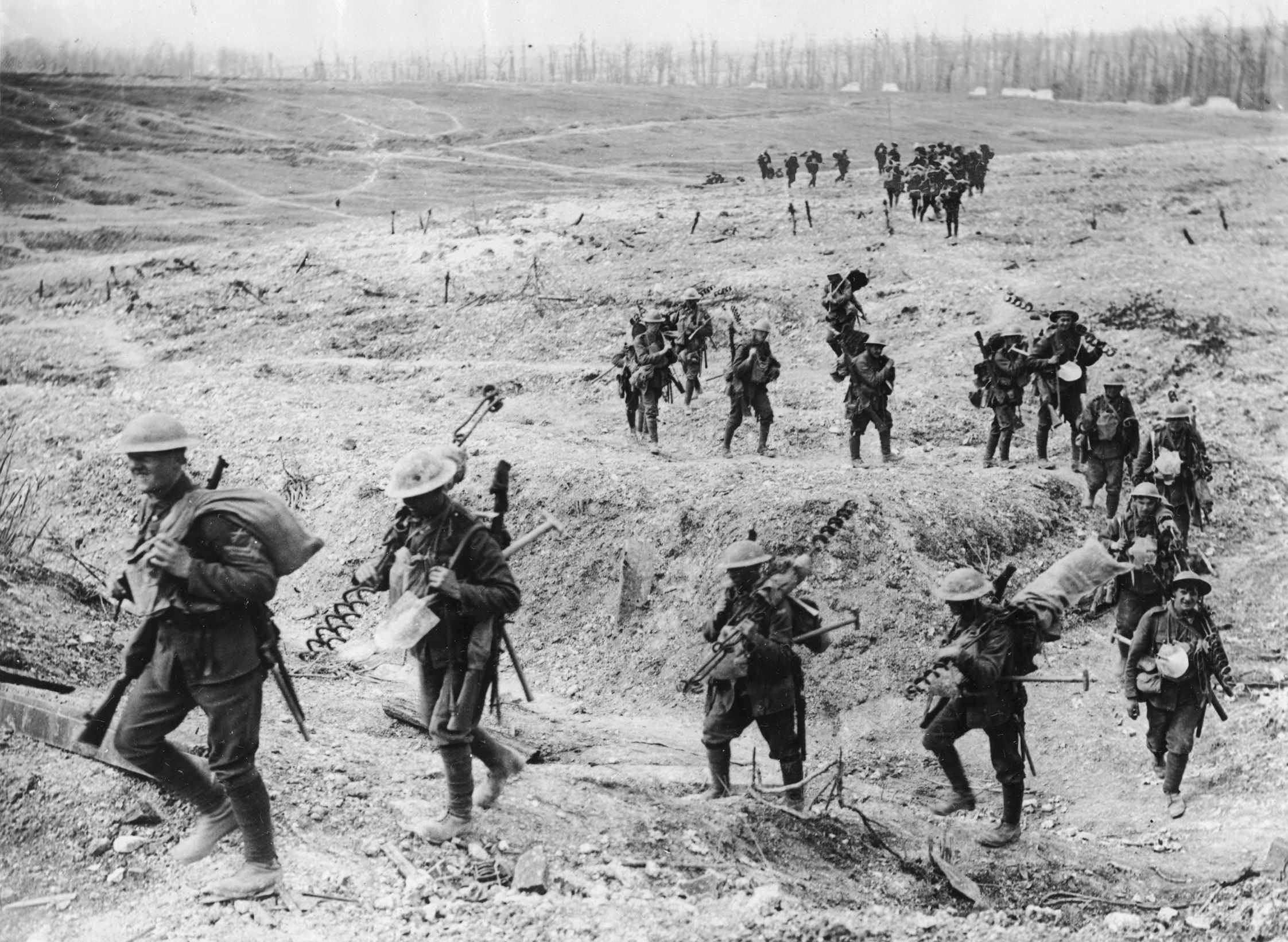
A wiring party with shovels and screw pickets.

Due to the extreme dangers inherent with no man's land, specialized tools and methods were implemented to make the process quieter and more effective. Pickets, or metal posts, were originally used to hold up the wire and were hammered in by a muffled mallet. However, this still produced noise, rendering the sappers targets. Therefore, screw pickets or 'cork-screws' were produced. These looped steel posts had a drill-like end, allowing it to be twisted into the ground noiselessly and the wire then wrapped around it.

The wiring parties began by creeping into no man's land carrying all their equipment, including the 6-foot-tall (1.8 m) screw-pickets and rolls of sharp barbed wire. Often this was a painful task in itself:

You mention in your letter about what I would like or need most ... However, I'm not complaining or asking for anything so don't worry about me. A good stout pair of gloves for handling barbed wire or fur gloves (lined) would be acceptable. (Lt. Cecil Louis' letter to his wife, 1916)

Erecting wire was time consuming and meticulous; sappers had to first repair wire by hand, then construct new defences if needed. Destroying wire, on the other hand, could be done either by going through, over, or under the wire, and could be done by hand or by using wire-cutting shells and mortars. The object of the wiring parties was to slow down the enemy’s attack, while speeding up their own. For this reason, workers attempted to make it impossible for the enemy to get to their trench, while sabotaging the enemy’s wire for their own benefit. In addition, though the distance between trenches varied between 7 and 500 yards, workers tried to erect barbed wire defences as far away from their trench as possible, to prevent the enemy from getting too close to the trench, or possibly lobbing in grenades.

== Dangers ==
Working with barbed wire was a nasty job under any circumstances, but when you were handling it in the dark and within a hundred yards of rifles and machine guns that would shoot at the least sound, you were doing one of the most nerve-wracking bits of work that could possibly be imagined...the slightest move might mean death for half your party.

Wiring parties faced the constant danger of being noticed by enemy searchlights or troops. Enemy sentries were trained to listen and look for these nighttime raiders, and any suspicious sounds or movements could give away the men's position and consequently bring a concentration of heavy fire that way. Unprotected and often standing, wiring parties were subject to enemy flares which would expose them immediately, causing them to have to lie flat, even on the very wire they were carrying.

To conceal themselves as much as possible, party members left extra supplies in the trench, and only ventured out at night. The teams scrambled to work as quickly and silently as possible, as such stressful night work and physical labour promoted fatigue and little time to sleep. Also, returning to one's trench in the middle of the night proved tricky, as workers often got lost on their way back. Finally, wiring parties were always wary of the enemy's parties, as they performed the same task each night.

== Popular culture ==
A wiring party is described in detail in the World War I novel All Quiet on the Western Front by E.M. Remarque, as well as the 1930 film based on it. Paul Bäumer, the main character, describes an experience of front line duty in a nighttime wiring party. Part way through the work, they are shelled and one of his comrades is killed.
