= List of Norwegian cattle breeds =

This is a list of the cattle breeds considered in Norway to be wholly or partly of Norwegian origin. Some may have complex or obscure histories, so inclusion here does not necessarily imply that a breed is predominantly or exclusively Norwegian.

Local name	English name, if used	Notes	Image
Dølafe^{[1]}^{[4]}	Døla Cattle	traditional breed, merged into Norwegian Red in 1963,^{[5]} endangered-maintained^{[3]}	
Lyngdalsfe	Lyngdal	traditional breed, merged into the Sør og Vestlandsfe in 1947, extinct^{[5]}	
Norsk Rødt Fe^{[1]}^{[4]}	Norwegian Red	modern composite breed, formed 1961 by merger of Østlansk Rødkolle and Norsk Rødt og Hvitt Fe	
Norsk Rødt og Hvitt Fe^{[5]}	Norwegian Red-and-White	composite, created 1939 from Swedish Red-and-White, Ayrshire, Hedmark and Red Troender; merged into Norwegian Red in 1961^{[5]}	
Østlandsk Rødkolle^{[1]}^{[4]}	Eastern Red Polled Cattle	traditional breed, critical-maintained^{[3]}	
Sidet trønderfe og nordlandsfe^{[1]}^{[4]}	Sided Trønder and Nordland Cattle	traditional breed, endangered-maintained^{[3]}	
Sør og Vestlandsfe^{[5]}	South and West Norwegian	created in 1947 by merger of Vestlandsk Fjordfe, Vestlandsk Raudkolle and Lyngdal; merged into Norwegian Red in 1968; extinct^{[5]}	
Telemarkfe^{[1]}^{[4]}	Telemark	traditional breed, endangered-maintained^{[3]}	
Vestlandsk Fjordfe^{[1]}^{[4]}	Western Fjord	traditional breed, merged into the Sør og Vestlandsfe in 1947,^{[5]} endangered-maintained^{[3]}	
Vestlandsk Raudkolle^{[1]}^{[4]}	Western Red Polled	traditional breed, merged into the Sør og Vestlandsfe in 1947,^{[5]} endangered-maintained^{[3]}	
