= Screw picket =

Metal device to secure objects to the ground

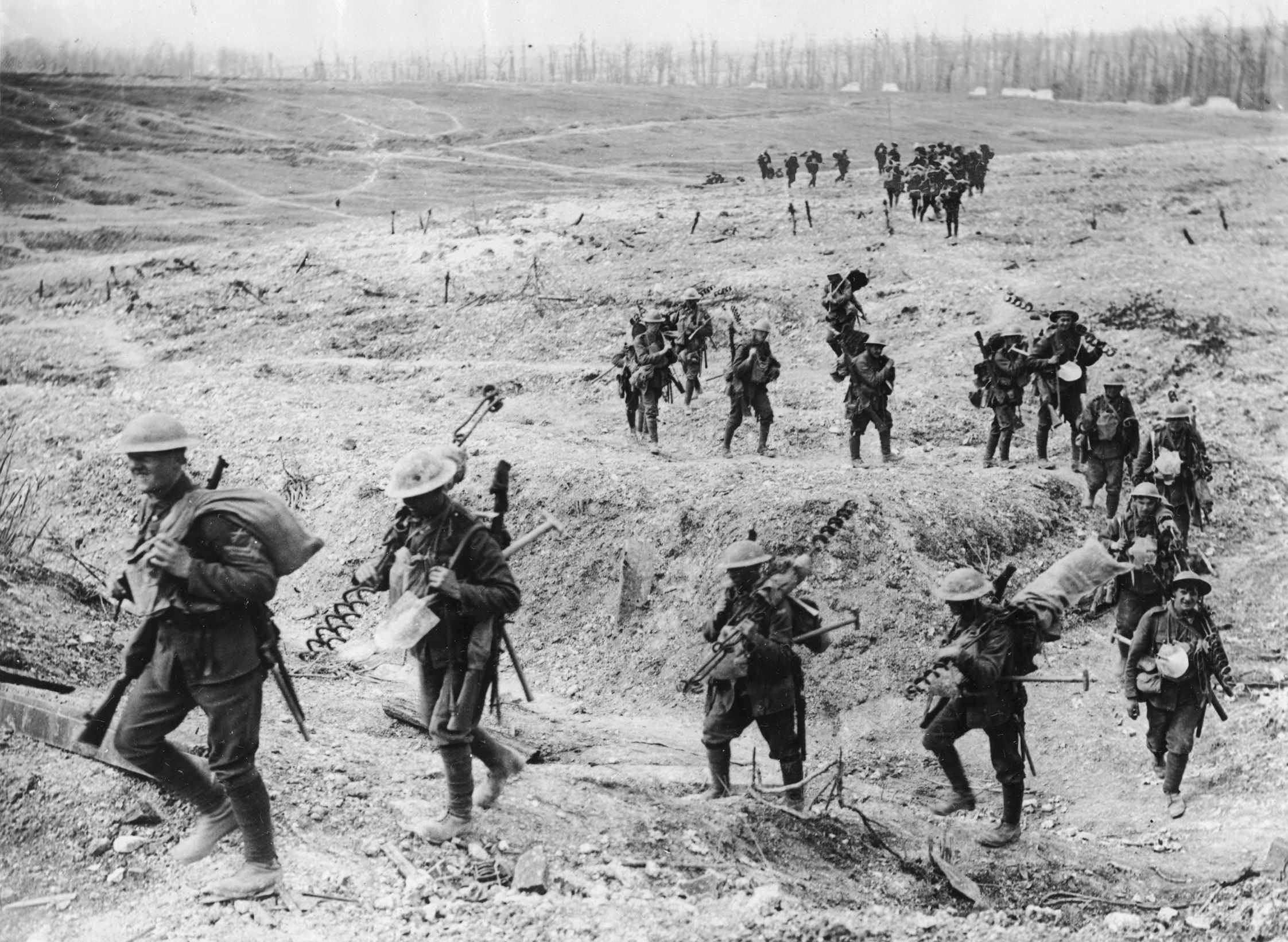
A wiring party with shovels and screw pickets.

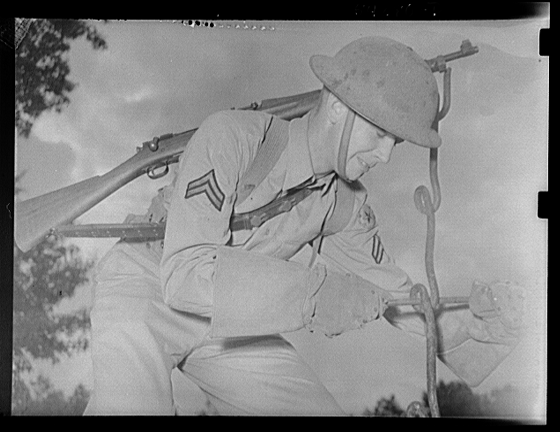
A soldier using a barbed wire anchor spike to screw in a picket at Fort Belvoir, Virginia (August, 1942)

A screw picket is a metal device which is used to secure objects to the ground. Today, screw pickets are used widely to temporarily "picket" dogs. They are also used to graze animals such as sheep, goats, and horses. Screw pickets are also used to stabilize small trees, tent poles, and other objects that are intended to remain upright.

The original picket was a stake hammered into the ground to secure a horse by tying it to the stake. This required a second tool (a hammer) or the availability of a rock to use instead of a tool. The screw picket is screwed (by turning it) into the ground. In hard ground, it requires a second tool (a leverage bar, or a spare screw picket) or the availability of a length of wood. Screw pickets can be easily bent or broken, but less easily pulled from the ground.

== Military non-equestrian use ==
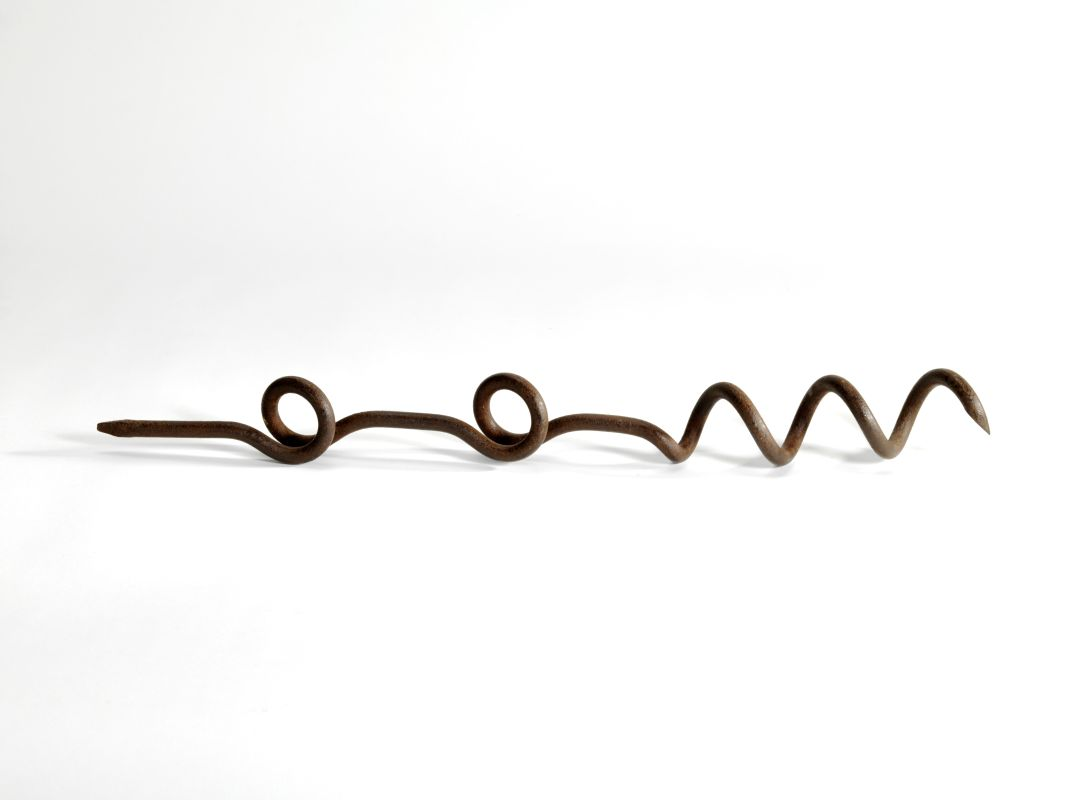
Barbed wire picket

Screw pickets (used as supports for barbed wire defences) were introduced c. 1915 as a replacement for timber posts. Crown Iron Works Co. (Minneapolis, MN) made over 10 million of these screw post pickets for WW1, WW2 and the Cuban Missile Crisis. The French name for this type of "steel stake" was "queue de cochon" or pigtail. The World War I steel stake became known in the British Army as a "corkscrew picket". The corkscrew picket was made from a steel bar which had its bottom end bent into a spiral coil. It also had three loops or "eyes" (some even had four) formed, one at top, one at midway and one just above the corkscrew spiral. The final product was about eight feet long.

Groups of soldiers known as wiring parties went out at night into no man's land to position these supports. They later strung the barbed wire through the loops to form a defensive wire obstacle as a protection for their trench line. The British called this type of stake a 'corkscrew' picket because it was screwed into the ground rather than hammered in as the timber posts had been (the hammering made loud noise, usually attracting enemy fire). The screw pickets replaced the timber posts (although screw pickets were less rigid than timber posts), because they could be installed rapidly and silently. A wiring party is described in detail in World War I novel All Quiet on the Western Front by contemporary author Erich Maria Remarque.

The corkscrew picket was screwed into the ground by turning it in a clockwise direction using an entrenching tool's handle or a stick inserted in the bottom eye of the picket for leverage. The bottom eye was used in order to avoid bending the vertical bar of the picket.

== See also ==
- Auger (drill)
- Materiel
- Wire obstacle
- Trench warfare
