= Géraud Réveilhac =

French general (1851–1937)

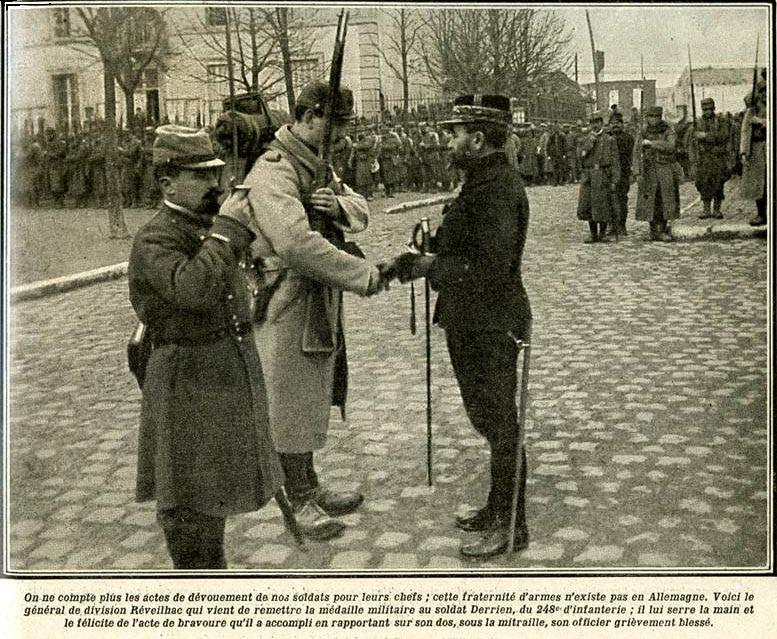
An image - published in 1915 - showing General Géraud Réveilhac presenting the Médaille militaire to a soldier named Derrien who saved the life of an officer.

Géraud François Gustave Réveilhac (16 February 1851 – 26 February 1937) was a French général de division during World War I. He gained infamy for the Souain corporals affair in 1915 when four non-commissioned officers were executed as an example to other troops he commanded who had refused to attack a heavily-defended position on the Western Front. His actions were an inspiration for Humphrey Cobb's novel Paths of Glory; the 1957 film of the same name was made by Stanley Kubrick. In 1916 he was relieved of front line duty. He was made a commander in the French reserves until the end of the war.

== Early life and career ==
Born on 16 February 1851 in Aurillac, France, Réveilhac went on to graduate from the Ecole Spéciale Militaire de Saint-Cyr in August 1870, as a sub-lieutenant. He became a prisoner of the Prussians in December the same year, but was released on 8 January the following year. He took part in putting down the uprising in Limoges in April 1871, garnering praise from his superiors. Réveilhac was subsequently regularly promoted, being sent to Indochina to command a company in 1889, and was made général de brigade on 21 December 1909 as commanding officer of the 42nd Infantry Brigade. He was preparing for retirement by 1914 when World War I broke out.

== World War I ==
At the beginning of World War I, Réveilhac was commanding the 119th Infantry Brigade, part of the 60th Infantry Division, under Général de division Maurice Joppé, whom he replaced on 25 September 1914 as commanding officer of the division. Réveilhac was promoted to acting général de division on 6 October 1914.

Souain corporals affair

In March 1915, after two attempts to take a strong German position near Souain-Perthes-lès-Hurlus had failed, he ordered the 21st company of the 336th Infantry Regiment to make a bayonet charge against the position. But before the attack began, a preceding French barrage shelled their own side's trenches. Unscathed German machine guns quickly cut down the first wave. The remaining troops in the 21st company then refused to leave their trenches. On hearing this, Réveilhac ordered his divisional artillery to shell them in order to force them to attack. However, the artillery commander, Colonel Raoul Berube, refused to obey without a written order. Réveilhac did not issue one.

After the assault's failure, Réveilhac quickly ordered that 24 men from the infantry units involved should be tried by a war tribunal. Although all of those men were inevitably sentenced to death for failing to obey the order to attack, 20 men were given stays of execution, while four others—all corporals–were executed by firing squad as an example to the entire regiment. One of those shot was Théophile Maupas, an exemplary soldier, who had simply been chosen by lot.

Relieved of command

Réveilhac continued to treat his men with scant regard. In another case he ordered his troops to relaunch an attack, asserting that the percentage of acceptable losses had not been reached for that day. In February 1916, he was relieved of duty and forced by the General Staff to take three months leave. According to a confidential letter from General Joffre, he "seem[ed] to have arrived at the limit of his physical and intellectual capacity".

On his return to active service he was given a command in the reserves for the rest of the war.

== Post-war ==
At the end of the war, General Réveilhac was made Grand Officier of the Légion d'honneur. He retired to his country estate in Nantes, and died in his bed on 26 February 1937.

== Reputation ==
Réveilhac's actions in Souain were revealed in 1921 to much scandal, and he was condemned even in the military press. Réveilhac wrote a letter defending his actions, but it was censored by Minister of War Louis Barthou who believed publishing it would only increase the considerable notoriety of the affair.

The widow of Théophile Maupas, one of the corporals executed, fought to restore her husband's reputation, and was successful after nineteen years.

Humphrey Cobb's 1935 novel Paths of Glory and Stanley Kubrick's 1957 film with the same title are partly based on these events.
