= Paths of Glory (Cobb novel) =

1935 novel by Humphrey Cobb

- First edition cover
- Author: Humphrey Cobb
- Language: English
- Genre: War novel
- Publisher: Viking Press
- Publication date: June 1935
- Publication place: United States
- Media type: Print (Hardback)
- Pages: 265 pp
- OCLC: 994359
- LC Class: PS3505.O1385 P38

Paths of Glory is a 1935 war novel by Humphrey Cobb. Set during World War I, the story tells of the French 181st Regiment, which is ordered by General Assolant to carry out a reckless, futile attack across no-man's-land against an impregnable German stronghold nicknamed "the Pimple". When the attackers retreat after suffering high casualties, Assolant demands that large numbers of the surviving soldiers must be court martialed and executed for mutiny and cowardice in the face of the enemy. The Army Commander's chief of staff intercedes, and Assolant reluctantly accepts that "only" three members of the 181st will face the firing squad for cowardice.

Cobb based the plot on the Souain corporals affair, a WWI incident in which the French Army randomly selected four corporals from the 136th Regiment to be shot for cowardice as an example to others ("pour encourager les autres") following the failure of a March 1915 attack against a hill near Souain.

The novel was adapted into an acclaimed 1957 anti-war film Paths of Glory directed by Stanley Kubrick and starring Kirk Douglas.

== Plot ==
General Assolant, an arrogant and ambitious commander, is offered an opportunity by the Army Commander's chief of staff to try to capture an impregnable German stronghold nicknamed "the Pimple". The position has been held by the Germans for two years, and an attack is widely recognized to be a suicidal task due to insufficient manpower and the sheer strength of the fortification. Motivated by self-aggrandizement and the promise of a promotion, Assolant accepts the impossible assignment and forces the exhausted men of the 181st Regiment to undertake the charge. When the whistle blows to commence the operation, the soldiers encounter a devastating wall of machine-gun fire. The attack fails instantly, resulting in heavy, pointless casualties. Many men are pinned down and unable to even leave their trenches.

Furious that his path to personal glory has been thwarted, General Assolant deflects blame from the flawed military strategy onto the soldiers. He accuses the 181st of mutiny and cowardice in the face of the enemy. Initially, Assolant demands that most of the regiment's surviving soldiers be court-martialed and executed to serve as an example to the rest of the army. After high-level political maneuvering and intercession by his superiors, Assolant grudgingly agrees to reduce the body count: three soldiers will be selected to stand before a firing squad for cowardice. Rather than evaluating their actual behavior during the attack, the victims are chosen based on petty or random criteria: one soldier is sacrificed because his commanding officer wants to settle a personal score; another soldier is picked because he is deemed a "civilian deviant"; and the third soldier is chosen after drawing lots, leaving survival entirely to blind luck. A farcical, predetermined court-martial follows. The trial disregards the reality of the battlefield, the impregnability of the German fortress, and the rights of the accused.

Despite the absurdity and injustice of the charges, the three men are found guilty. The novel reaches its grim conclusion as the innocent soldiers are marched out and executed by a French firing squad.

== Background ==
Cobb was an American who enlisted in 1916 in the Canadian Army to fight in World War I (the U.S. had not yet entered the conflict). He served in the Royal Montreal Regiment of the First Canadian Division. He participated in trench warfare in France, including front-line duty at the 1918 Battle of Amiens.

In 1934, while working as an advertising copywriter in Manhattan, Cobb completed a war novel and showed it to a friend at Viking Press who recognized the book's value. At that point, the manuscript was untitled. Viking held a promotional contest to choose a suitable title for the book. The winning entry borrowed a line from Thomas Gray's 1751 poem, "Elegy in a Country Churchyard": "The paths of glory lead but to the grave".

In an "Author's Note" at the end of Paths of Glory, Cobb cited his historical sources, including a July 1934 dispatch in The New York Times, "French Acquit 5 Shot for Mutiny in 1915; Widows of 2 Win Awards of 7 Cents Each".

== Reception ==
Paths of Glory was a June 1935 Book-of-the-Month Club selection and appeared on best-seller lists. It garnered positive reviews, among them a Page 1 spread in The New York Times Book Review that claimed the novel could sweep "the reader off his feet by the sheer force of its truthfulness." The journal Social Science wrote: "Here is a grand book on the unknown horrors of war, written by a soldier who lived through the struggle on the Western front. Its story of individual lives and what war did to them is human, intense and gripping. Its conclusion is astounding. Its publishers declare: 'We publish Paths of Glory in the firm belief that it will become one of the most widely read books of our time – just as we know it will be instantly suppressed by any government moving toward war.'"

In the first eight weeks after publication, nearly 100,000 copies were printed, but then sales quickly lost momentum and the novel disappeared. Some argued that it suffered from unfortunate timing. In his review in The Spectator, British writer William Plomer made a prediction that was later borne out: "Had Paths of Glory been published when the fashion for war-books was at its height, it might easily have obtained as great a popular success as, for instance, All Quiet on the Western Front [1928], but now that the public taste has changed it is unlikely to do so well." A New York Times article quoted a Paths of Glory reviewer who said, "You emerge from reading this war book a little shell-shocked", and suggested that "this effect was apparently too strong for the general reading public".

In the 1980s, Professor Stephen Tabachnick classified Cobb's novel as a work of "neglected literature", noting at the time that it was not taught in courses on the modern war novel, and that only two or three scholarly articles had ever been written about it.

== Themes ==
In his book Screening the Novel, Gabriel Miller asserts that Cobb's main theme was "the exposure of the absurd and tragic gap between the officers and the enlisted men. Few American war novels have so damned the military power structure." As an example of officer disregard for human life, Miller cites a passage conveying French General Assolant's thought process while planning how "the Pimple" can be captured and held:

Men had to be killed, of course, sometimes lots of them. They absorbed bullets and shrapnel and by so doing made it possible for others to get through. Say, five per cent killed by their own barrage (a very generous allowance, that). Ten per cent lost in crossing no-man's-land, and twenty per cent more in getting through the wire. That left sixty-five per cent, and the worst part of the job over, the most exposed part.

Cobb then writes, "His reasoning was faulty and his percentages were pure guess-work, but he failed to notice his fallacies in the exuberance of winning a battle in his head."

David Simon contends that unlike other anti-war novels such as All Quiet on the Western Front, which still harbor "the sustaining seeds of heroism and nationalism in their depictions", Cobb's novel "has its focus on the chain of command. The target is the army itself as an institution, an unwieldy and unyielding organism that lurches from one murderous horror to the next, guided only by whichever combination of ambitions and vanities are in play at any moment."

== Adaptations ==
American playwright Sidney Howard adapted Paths of Glory for the Broadway stage, where it premiered at the Plymouth Theatre in September 1935. With its grim, unsparing portrayal of battlefield brutality, the play was not successful and closed after 23 performances. But Howard, himself a WWI veteran, insisted it was necessary to show the harsh reality of armed conflict. He also advocated for a filmed version of Paths of Glory, writing: "It seems to me that our motion picture industry must feel something of a sacred obligation to make the picture."

The film version of the novel, directed by Stanley Kubrick and starring Kirk Douglas, was released in 1957. Fulfilling Howard's "sacred obligation", Kubrick adapted it for the screen after being impressed with the book which he read as a teenager. He and his partners purchased the film rights from Cobb's widow for $10,000.

== See also ==
- List of books with anti-war themes
