= Henry Weston Farnsworth =

American journalist

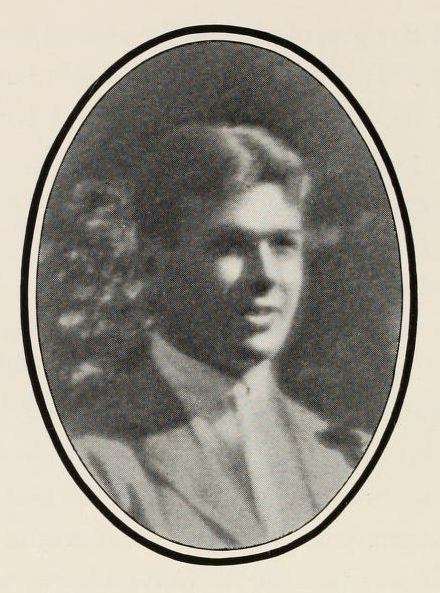
- Born: August 7, 1890; Dedham, Massachusetts, U.S.
- Died: September 28, 1915 (aged 25) near Tahure, France
- Conflicts: Second Battle of Champagne
- Awards: Médaille militaire
- Education: Groton School; Harvard College

Henry Weston Farnsworth (August 7, 1890 – September 28, 1915) was one of the first Americans killed as a soldier in World War I. He was a "newspaper correspondent, world traveler, adventure-seeker, avid reader, and member of the French Foreign Legion."

== Early life ==
Farnsworth was born on August 7, 1890, in Dedham, Massachusetts. He attended Groton School and then Harvard College where he was graduated in 1912. After graduating, he toured Vienna, Budapest, Constantinople, Odessa, Moscow, and St. Petersburg.

== Family ==
Farnsworth came from a Boston Brahmin family. His parents, William and Lucy Holman (née Burgess) Farnsworth, also had a daughter, Ellen Holman Farnsworth, who was said to be "the prettiest girl in Boston." Henry and Ellen were very close. Ellen was married to Alfred Lee Loomis, Henry's classmate at Harvard University. Ellen's great-grandson, Reed Hastings, was a co-founder of Netflix. Farnsworth was described as "bookish and idealistic."

The Farnsworths had homes on Westfield Street in Dedham and Beacon Street in Boston. The family purchased the Beacon Street home from Charles Winslow.

== Career ==
Farnsworth worked as a reporter for Collier's and The Providence Journal during the Balkan War. He was working as a reporter in Mexico when US troops occupied Veracruz in 1914 and when World War I began. He wrote a book about his experiences in the Balkans, The Log of a Would-be War Correspondent as well as several plays and five volumes of short stories. His letters were also posthumously published by his father.

After returning home, he worked for his father, a wool merchant in Boston.

== World War I ==
In the fall of 1914, Farnsworth sailed back from the United States to Europe before his family could object. He "got caught up in the military fever that was sweeping London and Paris." Preferring to fight, he refused to be a war correspondent.

Farnsworth enlisted with the French Foreign Legion on January 5, 1915, and served in several battles. He was hospitalized several times, but always showed an eagerness to return to the front. He often served the night patrol in no man's land. On one such occasion, after Italy declared war against the Central Powers, Farnsworth was part of a group who put newspapers announcing the declaration on the barbed wire near the German trenches. On March 15, 1915, he wrote to his mother: "I long to be with you all again, once the war ends. I think it will be this summer some time; then for the rest and peace of Dedham."

Farnsworth was killed in action at the battle of Fortin de Navarin near Tahure, France, on September 28, 1915, in the Second Battle of Champagne. He was shot in the neck and the spine by a machine gun. Sukuna, a Fijian comrade, pulled Farnsworth into a trench but was unable to save him. After watching Farnsworth die, Sukuna vowed to avenge his death, advanced towards the German line, and was shot in the leg.

Farnsworth was one of 642 men from Dedham who served in the war, and one of 18 who died. After his death, those with whom he served spoke of his spirit and bravery. He was posthumously awarded the Médaille militaire on October 1, 1915.

== Legacy ==
At Harvard's Lamont Library, the Farnsworth Room is dedicated in Farnsworth's honor. The room, which is "devoted to non-curricular leisure reading, houses approximately 4,000 eclectic titles." It "is a treasure trove of bizarre finds." Originally opened in Widener Library in 1916, and moved to Lamont upon the latter's opening in 1949, it was the first American college reading room dedicated to extracurricular reading. Alumnus Thomas Wolfe says he learned more in the Farnsworth Room than anywhere else at Harvard.

In 1920, Farnsworth's family erected a monument to him and the 130 Foreign Legionnaires from the 1st and 2nd Régiment Etrangers who died in the Battle of Champagne in Souain-Perthes-lès-Hurlus. It is an ossuary and holds the remains of the 130 Legionnaires. The stones for the monument came from the same quarry as those that form the Arc de Triomphe. The monument, which was designed by Alexandre Marcel, measures 17 metres (56 ft) by 22 metres (72 ft), with the entrance on the north. Due to the poor soil quality in Champagne, fertile soil from Seine-et-Marne was trucked in to plant fir and pine trees, as well as a thick hedge. An inscription on the memorial was written by Charles W. Eliot, and another contains the names of the men buried in it.

It was dedicated on November 3, 1920, by Joseph-Marie Tissier, bishop of Châlons. Present at the dedication were Farnsworth's parents, sister, Pierre-Georges Duport, and representatives of the French government. Darius Milhaud gave a speech. It is known today as the "American Monument" by the residents of Souain.

Rue Henry Farnsworth in Souain was named for Farnsworth at a ceremony in September 1965 that was attended by Ellen.

== Bibliography ==
- Conant, Jennet (October 15, 2013). Tuxedo Park: A Wall Street Tycoon and the Secret Palace of Science That Changed the Course of World War II. Simon and Schuster. ISBN 978-1-4767-6729-1.
