= Paths of Glory =

1957 film by Stanley Kubrick

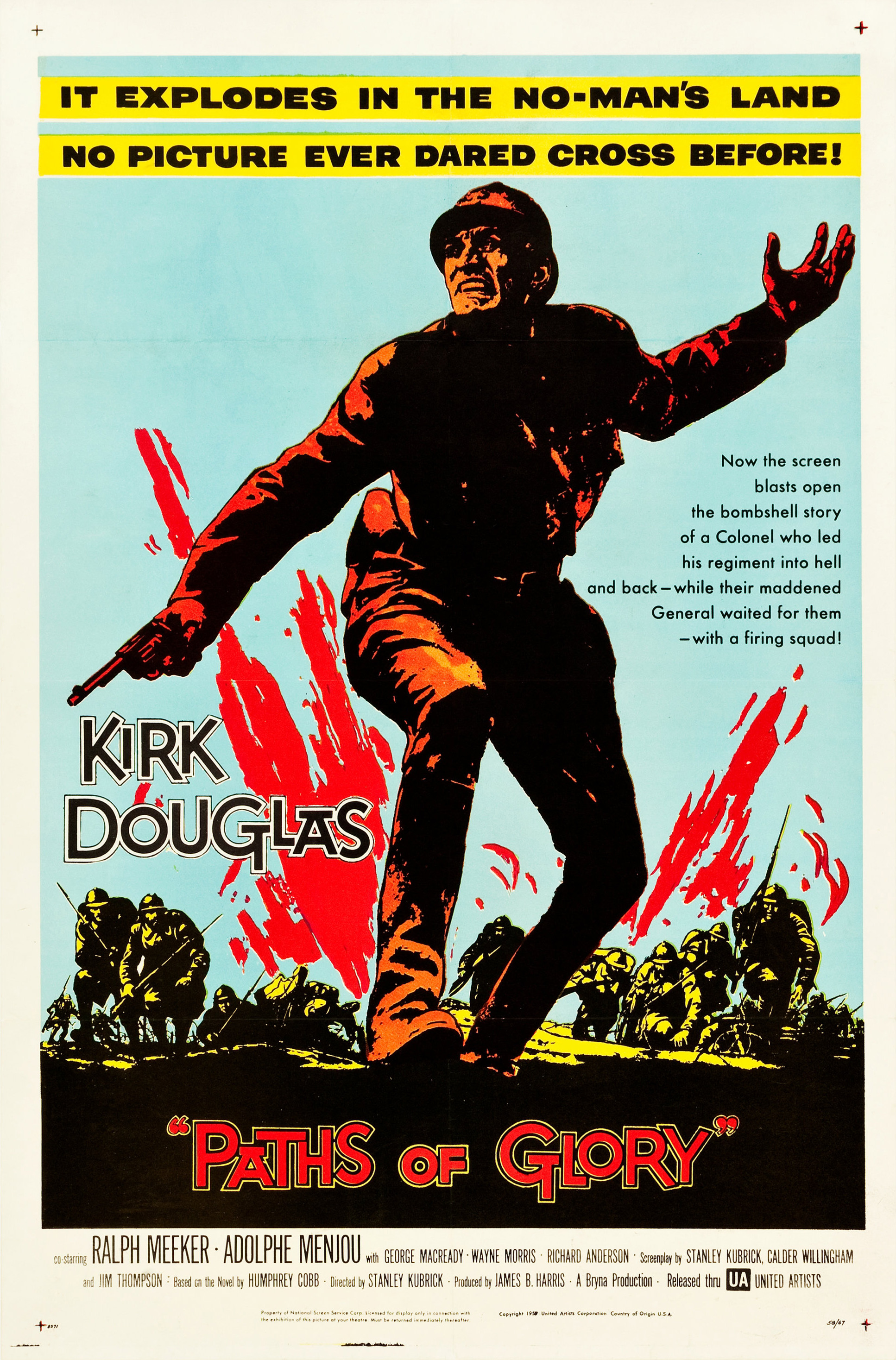
- Theatrical release poster
- Directed by: Stanley Kubrick
- Screenplay by: Stanley Kubrick; Calder Willingham; Jim Thompson
- Based on: Paths of Glory (1935 novel) by Humphrey Cobb
- Produced by: James B. Harris
- Starring: Kirk Douglas; Ralph Meeker; Adolphe Menjou; George Macready; Wayne Morris; Richard Anderson
- Cinematography: Georg Krause
- Edited by: Eva Kroll
- Music by: Gerald Fried
- Production companies: Bryna Productions; Harris-Kubrick Pictures Corporation
- Distributed by: United Artists
- Release dates: November 1, 1957 (Munich premiere); December 20, 1957 (United States)
- Running time: 88 minutes
- Country: United States
- Language: English
- Budget: $900,000–1 million
- Box office: $1.2 million

Paths of Glory is a 1957 American anti-war film directed by Stanley Kubrick, from a screenplay he co-wrote with Calder Willingham and Jim Thompson. It is adapted from the 1935 novel of the same name by Humphrey Cobb, which in turn was based on the Souain corporals affair during World War I. The film stars Kirk Douglas as Colonel Dax, the commanding officer of French soldiers who refuse to continue a suicidal attack, after which Dax defends them against charges of cowardice in a court-martial. It also features Ralph Meeker, Adolphe Menjou, George Macready, Timothy Carey, Joe Turkel, Wayne Morris and Richard Anderson.

The film was co-produced through Douglas' film production company, Bryna Productions, and a joint venture between Stanley Kubrick and James B. Harris, Harris-Kubrick Pictures. Due to the film's negative depiction of the French military, it could not be filmed there, and was instead shot in West Germany. It was likewise not released in France until 1972.

Paths of Glory was released by United Artists on December 20, 1957. It received critical acclaim and several international accolades, including a BAFTA Award nomination for Best Film, and is considered one of the greatest war films ever made. In 1992, the film was deemed "culturally, historically or aesthetically significant" by the Library of Congress and selected for preservation in the United States National Film Registry.

== Plot ==
In 1916, during World War I in Northern France, French Major General Georges Broulard orders his subordinate, Brigadier General Paul Mireau, to take "the Anthill", a well-defended German position on the far side of no man's land. Mireau initially refuses, calling it impossible. When Broulard mentions a potential promotion, Mireau convinces himself the attack can succeed. In the trenches, Mireau throws a private out of the regiment for showing signs of shell shock. Mireau leaves the planning of the attack to Colonel Dax, despite Dax's protests.

Before the attack, drunken Lieutenant Roget leads a night-time reconnoiter, sending one of his two men ahead. Overcome by fear while waiting for the scout's return, Roget lobs a grenade, accidentally killing the man. Corporal Paris, the surviving scout, confronts Roget, who denies wrongdoing and falsifies his report to Colonel Dax.

The daylight attack on the Anthill is a failure. Dax leads the first wave of soldiers over the top under heavy rifle and machine gun fire, but none of them reach the German trenches and the follow up waves refuse to attack. Mireau orders his artillery to fire on them to force them onto the battlefield. The artillery commander refuses without written confirmation of the order.

To deflect blame for the attack's failure, Mireau decides to court-martial a hundred soldiers for cowardice. Broulard orders Mireau to reduce the number, and Mireau asks each company in the attacking wave to select one man. Roget picks Corporal Paris to keep him from testifying about the scouting mission. Private Ferol is deemed a "social undesirable" by his commander. Private Arnaud is chosen at random by lots, despite being decorated twice for heroism.

Dax, a top criminal defense lawyer in civilian life, volunteers to defend the men. The trial, however, is a farce, with no formal written indictment, nor court stenographer, and the court refuses to admit evidence that would support acquittal. In his closing statement, Dax angrily denounces the proceedings. Despite his efforts, the sentence of death is confirmed and the condemned men are shot the next day by firing squad.

Following the executions, Dax informs Broulard that Mireau had ordered French artillery to fire onto its own men. Broulard tells Mireau that he will be investigated for his action. Mireau denounces this as a betrayal by his subordinate. Broulard offers Mireau's command to Dax, assuming Dax's attempts to stop the executions were a ploy to gain Mireau's job. Disgusted at Broulard's assumption, Dax lashes out at him. Discovering Dax was sincere, Broulard rebukes him for his idealism, and Dax in turn denounces Broulard as a degenerate sadist.

Shortly afterwards, Dax notices some of his soldiers carousing loudly at an inn and jeering at a coerced German singer, but they grow more subdued and hum along as she sings a sentimental German folk song, "The Faithful Hussar". Dax is informed by Boulanger that they have been ordered to return to the trenches immediately, but Dax instead allows the men to stay in the bar for a few moments longer.

== Cast ==
- Kirk Douglas as Colonel Dax, commanding officer, 701st Infantry Regiment
- Ralph Meeker as Corporal Philippe Paris, 701st Infantry Regiment
- Adolphe Menjou as Major General Georges Broulard, corps commander
- George Macready as Brigadier General Paul Mireau, divisional commander
- Wayne Morris as Lieutenant Roget, company commander, 701st Infantry Regiment
- Richard Anderson as Major Saint-Auban, Mireau's aide de camp
- Joe Turkel as Private Pierre Arnaud, 701st Infantry Regiment (credited as Joseph Turkel)
- Christiane Harlan as German singer (credited as Susanne Christian)
- Jerry Hausner as café proprietor
- Peter Capell as president of the court martial (and narrator)
- Emile Meyer as Father Duprée
- Bert Freed as Staff Sergeant Boulanger, 701st Infantry Regiment
- Kem Dibbs as Private Lejeune, 701st Infantry Regiment
- Timothy Carey as Private Maurice Ferol, 701st Infantry Regiment
- Fred Bell as shell-shocked soldier
- John Stein as Captain Rousseau, artillery battery commander
- Harold Benedict as Captain Nichols, artillery liaison officer
- James B. Harris as soldier in attack (uncredited)

== Production ==
=== Background ===
The title of Cobb's novel came from the ninth stanza of Thomas Gray's poem "Elegy Written in a Country Churchyard" (1751).

The boast of heraldry, the pomp of pow'r,
And all that beauty, all that wealth e'er gave,
Awaits alike th'inevitable hour.
The paths of glory lead but to the grave.

The book was a minor success when published in 1935, retelling the true-life affair of four French soldiers who were executed to set an example to the rest of the troops. The novel was adapted to the stage the same year by Sidney Howard, World War I veteran and scriptwriter of Gone with the Wind. The play was a flop on Broadway because of its harsh anti-war scenes that alienated the audience. Nonetheless, Howard continued to believe in the relevance of the subject matter and thought it should be made into a film, writing, "It seems to me that our motion picture industry must feel something of a sacred obligation to make the picture." Fulfilling Howard's hope, Stanley Kubrick decided to adapt it to the screen after he remembered reading the book when he was younger. Kubrick and his partners purchased the film rights from Cobb's widow for $10,000.

Gray's stanza reflects Kubrick's feelings about war as well, and that becomes clear in the narrative of the film – a long battle for something with such an unimportant name as the "Ant Hill". Some of Kubrick's unrealized projects contained themes of war as well. Kubrick told the New York Times in 1972:

Man isn't a noble savage, he's an ignoble savage. He is irrational, brutal, weak, silly, unable to be objective about anything where his own interests are involved – that about sums it up. I'm interested in the brutal and violent nature of man because it's a true picture of him. And any attempt to create social institutions on a false view of the nature of man is probably doomed to failure.

Paths of Glory is based loosely on the true story of the Souain corporals affair when four French soldiers were executed in 1915 during World War I under General Géraud Réveilhac for failure to follow orders. The soldiers were exonerated posthumously in 1934. The novel is about the French execution of innocent men to strengthen others' resolve to fight. The French Army did carry out military executions for cowardice, as did most of the other major participants in World War I, excluding the United States of America and Australia. The United States sentenced 24 soldiers to death for cowardice, but the sentences were never carried out. However, the film does repudiate the practice of selecting individuals at random and executing them as a punishment for the sins of the whole group. This is similar to the Roman practice of decimation, which was rarely used by the French Army in World War I.

=== Development ===
Kubrick said of his decision to make a war film: "One of the attractions of a war or crime story is that it provides an almost unique opportunity to contrast an individual or our contemporary society with a solid framework of accepted value, which the audience becomes fully aware of, and which can be used as a counterpoint to a human, individual, emotional situation. Further, war acts as a kind of hothouse for forced, quick breeding of attitudes and feelings. Attitudes crystallise and come out into the open. Conflict is natural, when it would in a less critical situation have to be introduced almost as a contrivance, and would thus appear forced or, even worse, false."

Although Kubrick's previous film The Killing had failed at the box office, it had managed to land on several critical top-ten lists for the year. Dore Schary, then head of production at Metro-Goldwyn-Mayer, liked the film and hired Kubrick and Harris to develop film stories from MGM's pile of scripts and purchased novels. Finding nothing they liked, Kubrick remembered reading Cobb's book at the age of 14 and the "great impact" it had upon him and suggested it as their next project. Schary strongly doubted the commercial success of a box office unfriendly story shot in black and white which had already been turned down by every other major studio.

MGM ultimately rejected the idea of the film based on fears that it would be unfavorable to European distributors and audiences. After Schary was fired by MGM in a major shake-up, Kubrick and Harris managed to interest Kirk Douglas in a script version that Kubrick had done with Calder Willingham. After reading the script, Kirk Douglas was impressed and managed to get an advance for a $1 million budget from United Artists to star in and help produce the film. Of the roughly $1 million budget, more than a third was allocated to Kirk Douglas' salary.

=== Writing ===
Kubrick eventually hired Calder Willingham to work on the script of Paths of Glory (1957), of which Jim Thompson had written earlier drafts. The specific contributions by Kubrick, Thompson, and Willingham to the final script were disputed, and the matter went to arbitration with the Writers' Guild. Willingham claimed that Thompson had minimal involvement in the final script of the film, claiming responsibility for 99 percent of Paths of Glory for himself and that Thompson had not written any of the dialogue. When Thompson's draft screenplay was compared to the final film, it was clear that Thompson had written seven scenes, including the reconnaissance mission and the scene with soldiers the night before their executions by firing squad. In the end, the Writers' Guild attributed the script in the order of Kubrick, Willingham and then Thompson.

Parts of the screenplay were taken from Cobb's work verbatim. However, Kubrick made several changes to the narrative of the novel in his adaptation, most notably his shift of focus to Colonel Dax, as opposed to Paris, Ferol and Arnaud as in the novel. Also, whereas Cobb took the name "The Pimple" from a notorious German stronghold (aka Hill 119) at the northern tip of Vimy Ridge, the screenplay renamed it to "The Anthill" to emphasize how the cold, calculating generals viewed their soldiers as tiny, disposable insects. One speculated addition is when General Mireau says "show me a patriot, and I'll show you an honest man", and Colonel Dax responds that Samuel Johnson once said: "Patriotism is the last refuge of the scoundrel".

Primarily, Kubrick and Thompson had added a happy ending to the film to make the film more commercial to the general public, where the men's lives are saved from execution at the last minute by the general. However, Kirk Douglas demanded these changes be reversed. It led to a first major argument between director and star, who thought Kubrick had been rewriting the script behind his back: "I called Stanley to my room ... I hit the ceiling. I called him every four-letter word I could think of ... 'I got the money, based on that [original] script. Not this shit!' I threw the script across the room. 'We're going back to the original script, or we're not making the picture.' Stanley never blinked an eye. We shot the original script. I think the movie is a classic, one of the most important pictures—possibly the most important picture—Stanley Kubrick has ever made." On the Criterion Collection Blu-ray, James B. Harris claims to have gotten this ending past distributors by sending the entire script instead of just the reversed ending, in the knowledge that those distributors would not read through the whole script again. After viewing the film, United Artists was happy with the changes and left the ending as it is.

=== Filming ===
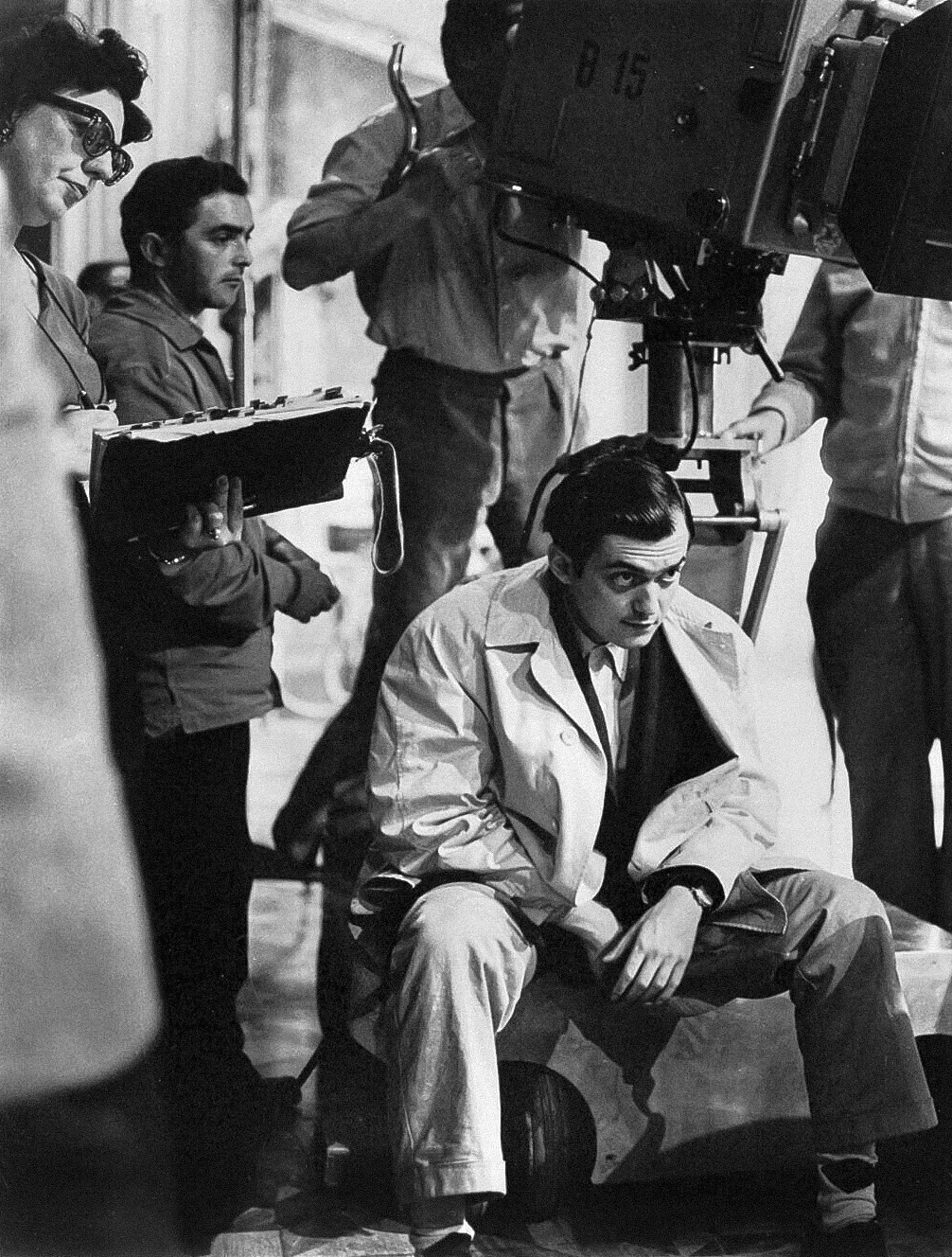
Kubrick on the set of Paths of Glory (1957 publicity photo)

Production took place entirely in Bavaria, Germany, especially at the Schleissheim Palace near Munich. Timothy Carey was fired during production. He was reportedly extremely difficult to work with, even to the extent of faking his own kidnapping, holding up the whole production. He was replaced in the scenes remaining to be shot with a double.

Due to having three years' military training, around 600 German police officers were used as extras for soldiers. The last scenes filmed were those that take place on the battlefield. For the construction of the battlefield, Kubrick rented 5,000 square yards (0.4 hectares) of land from a local farmer. It took Kubrick a month to set up the filming of the assault, arranging props and tearing up the field to look like a war zone. For the filming of the battle sequence, the battlefield was divided into five regions where explosive charges were specifically placed. This made it easier for Kubrick to film the dying of extras as he split the extras into five groups, one for each of the regions, and each man would die in his own zone by an explosion that was near him.

An early critical test of Kubrick's obsession with control on the set came during the making of Paths of Glory. Douglas recalled that,

[Kubrick] made the veteran actor Adolphe Menjou do the same scene 17 times. "That was my best reading." Menjou announced. "I think we can break for lunch now." It was well past the usual lunch time but Kubrick said he wanted another take. Menjou went into an absolute fury. In front of Douglas and the entire crew he blasted off on what he claimed was Kubrick's dubious parentage and made several other unprintable references to Kubrick's relative greenness in the art of directing actors. Kubrick merely listened calmly and after Menjou had spluttered to an uncomplimentary conclusion said quietly: "All right, let's try the scene once more." With utter docility, Menjou went back to work. "Stanley instinctively knew what to do," Douglas says.

The only female character in the film, the woman who sings "The Faithful Hussar", is portrayed by German actress Christiane Harlan (credited in the film as Susanne Christian). She and Kubrick met on the set and later married, remaining together until his death in 1999.

==== Cinematography ====
Paths of Glory employs both camera-work and audio cues to create a sense of realism, thus making it easier for the audience to sympathize with the plight of the accused soldiers. In the beginning of the film a snare drum plays, and the music is reminiscent of war era newsreels. During the battle sequences, the camera keeps pace with the soldiers but in other ways, the shots look like old trench warfare footage from World War I. The film's choice of black and white further emphasizes its similarity to the actual newsreels of the conflict.

Richard Anderson, who played the acerbic prosecutor, recalled of Kubrick: "As soon as we started shooting, I knew immediately what Stanley was interested in: The shot. Always the shot. He worked with George Krause, the German cinematographer, to make sure that everything looked like a newsreel of World War I. Kubrick had studied many photographs of the war in the library. The film was low keyed and had a grainy look to it. That's what Stanley was interested in."

Kubrick's vision of war was far bleaker than that of some other films of the era, which also influenced the director's choice to shoot the picture in black and white. The visuals also allow the audience to see the difference between "life in the trenches" and "life in the command". From the opulent mansion of the high-ranking officers, the audience notices wide shots from the exterior and the interior. The viewer misses nothing; every decadent piece of furniture, jewelry or bauble that the senior officers have, in sharp contrast to the trenches where the shots are much tighter. Close ups and point-of-view shots (e.g. from Colonel Dax's perspective) are cramped and tight, suffocating for the audience. A "walking" tracking shot in the trenches filmed from Dax's point-of-view leaves the audience much like the other soldiers that line their walls, feeling stuck and trapped in the confined and dangerous space.

=== Sound design ===
The musical score by Gerald Fried makes extensive use of percussion instruments, specifically military drums.

Kubrick used sound, or the lack thereof, to build tension and suspense in the film, particularly towards the beginning when the three soldiers are given orders to check on the Anthill. This scene is in silence, with no use of diegetic/non-diegetic sound, working well to add depth and rawness. Much of what the viewer can hear throughout the film is explosions in the distance and the sound of a whistle being blown, further adding to the overall documentary style of the film. The lack of a big bold score gives no suggestion of heroism to the plot of the film, and the sounds of people dying are a common trope associated with Stanley Kubrick's films. The song towards the ending happens within the narrative. In the tavern with the French soldiers of Dax's regiment, a young woman sings a traditional German folk song of that era, "Der treue Husar". With Kubrick's use of mise-en-scene, the audience is able to see the German woman's performance bring the men to tears through various close-ups and angles. The troopers begin to hum and eventually sing along to the tune in an expression of their basic humanity. Paths of Glory later ends in the same way it began with the familiar snare/drum roll used in the opening, indicative of a lack of change throughout the film. Kubrick's use of sounds and song functions as a kind of narration for the audience, linking each sound to a later or earlier scene in the film.

== Release ==
The film had a special screening in Munich, Germany, on September 18. A report by Frank Gordon from the Bavarian capital in the September 27 issue of the widely read New York trade paper Varietyread:

Munich, Sept. 18.
Three hundred specially invited local VIPs, Army brass, Radio Free Europe staffers, German stage and film luminaries mingled with Kirk Douglas, Janet Leigh, Tony Curtis and Ernest Borgnine to see a "not for review" showing of Jim Harris' Munich-filmed "Paths of Glory."...Douglas, who stars in "Paths," is presently shooting his own Bryna-produced "Vikings" in this city's Geiselgasteig studios. "Vikings" co-stars Curtis, Borgnine, and Leigh....A World War I action story, ["Paths"] will be released through United Artists. Also a Bryna production, it was directed by Stanley ("The Killing") Kubrick.

The "world premiere" was held in Munich on November 1, 1957.

In the United States, the film was initially shown only in Los Angeles, California at the Fine Arts Theatre on December 20, 1957, and on Christmas Day at the Victoria Theatre in New York City. The American trade journal Motion Picture Daily explained at the time that "Paths" was being shown in those cities before the end of 1957 to ensure the film would qualify for nominations for the next Academy Award ceremonies, which were to be held on March 26, 1958.

The picture was released nationwide in the US in January 1958.

=== Box office ===
The film cost slightly less than $1 million. Assessments vary with regard to the film's ultimate success at the box office, with some sources citing it as a modest financial success and others noting that it only managed to recoup most, if not all, of its production costs. The film did, however, earn Kubrick widespread critical acclaim, while it also generated widespread controversy, especially in Europe.

== Reception and influence ==
Original trailer (1957)

Although the film did not receive a single nomination for the Academy Awards of 1958, it was nominated for and collected several international awards. Those awards and many positive reviews from film critics further enhanced Kubrick's already growing reputation. The film was nominated for a BAFTA Award under the category Best Film but lost to The Bridge on the River Kwai. The production also received in Finland the Jussi Awards' Diploma of Merit, was nominated for a Writers' Guild of America Award in 1959, and won the prestigious Grand Prix of the Belgian Film Critics Association. Kubrick himself received on February 17, 1959, in Rome the Italian critics' Silver Ribbon, an award recognizing him as "the best foreign director of 1958 for his movie 'Paths of Glory'."

=== Controversy ===
On its release, the film's anti-military tone was subject to severe public criticism and governmental censorship.

- In France, both active and retired personnel from the French military vehemently criticized the film—and its portrayal of the French Army—after it was released in Belgium. The French government placed enormous pressure on United Artists (the European distributor) not to release the film in France. The film was eventually shown in France in 1975 when anti-war attitudes were more acceptable.
- The film was withdrawn from the Berlin Film Festival to avoid straining relations with France. It was then not shown in Germany until two years after its theatrical release in the United States.
- In Spain, the fascist government of Francisco Franco objected to the film. It was not shown there until 1986, 11 years after Franco's death.
- The Swiss government banned any presentations of the film until 1970 on the grounds that it was "incontestably offensive" to France, its judicial system, and its army.
- The film was banned in all United States military establishments, both at home and overseas, due to its content.

=== Reviews in the United States, 1957–1958 ===
Despite the film's harsh reception in Europe by various governments, French war veterans, and media outlets, in the months after the motion picture's initial screenings in the United States, reactions to Kubrick's production featured in American newspapers and trade publications were generally positive. Nevertheless, perceived deficiencies in the film's structure and content were expressed by some of the nation's leading reviewers in 1957 and 1958.

==== Issues with "colloquial English" dialogue ====
In his December 26, 1957, review for The New York Times, Bosley Crowther credits Kubrick for creating a visually "terrific", highly intense picture. In particular, Crowther draws attention to the story's execution scene, which he describes as "one of the most craftily directed and emotionally lacerating that we have ever seen." He does, though, also identify two "troubling flaws" that he saw in the film, one being within the "realm of technique", the other within the "realm of significance":

We feel that Mr. Kubrick – and Mr. Douglas – have made a damaging mistake in playing it in colloquial English, with American accents and attitudes, while studiously making it look as much as possible like a document of the French Army in World War I. The illusion of reality is blown completely whenever anyone talks....
As for the picture's significance, it comes to an inconclusive point. Its demonstration of injustice is like an exhibit in a bottle in a medical museum. It is grotesque, appalling, nauseating – but so framed and isolated that, when you come away, you are left with the feeling that you have been witness to nothing more than a horribly freakish incident.

The absence of any spoken French or suitably accented English dialogue in a highly focused portrayal of French soldiers continued to be a point of debate in American critical analysis of Paths of Glory. Philip K. Scheuer, who wrote about films for the Los Angeles Times from the 1920s to 1967, was another reviewer who addressed the issue again in the newspaper's January 16, 1958, edition. In a follow-up discussion about the "controversial war picture", in a commentary subtitled "Question of Foreign Accents Raised by 'Paths of Glory'", Scheuer cites the style of speech used in the film and the screenplay's "weak" ending as two reasons he omitted the production from his "selection of 1957's best". Like Bosley Crowther, he found the "linguistic" aspects of the dialogue wholly distracting. "In 'Paths'", Scheuer writes, "the actors all...employ ordinary colloquial English – much of it, I felt, delivered badly – although Adolph Menjou, being of French descent, did convey a certain quality of Frenchness," adding, "The others were simply Hollywood types."

==== The film's "grim" plot ====
The overriding tone of the motion picture also evoked comments about the picture's marketability, namely its scant appeal to a very large segment of moviegoers. "Grim" is the word that frequently appears in contemporary reviews of the film, an adjective understandably applied given the story's brutal subject matter, and a word still commonly used even in complimentary assessments by critics. In its March 18, 1958 edition, the Chicago Daily Tribune summarizes the release as "a grim, forceful story, presented in blunt, unvarnished fashion, entirely lacking in the customary cliches, deftly directed." Whitney Williams, a critic for Variety, previewed the film six weeks before it opened at the Fine Arts Theatre in Los Angeles. In his review, which was published on November 20, 1957, Williams anticipates limited interest as well as limited box-office revenue for the picture:

"Paths of Glory" is a starkly realistic recital of French army politics in 1916 during World War I. While the subject is well handled and enacted in a series of outstanding characterizations, it seems dated and makes for grim screen fare. Even with the Kirk Douglas star name to spark its chances, outlook is spotty at best and will need all the hard selling United Artists, which is distributing the Bryna production, can muster.

Harrison's Reports, an independent and advertisement-free film review journal in 1957, agreed with Variety's critic and in November expressed doubts too that the "World War I melodrama" would be successful commercially after its general release in January 1958. "Just how it will fare at the box-office is a matter of conjecture", Harrison's stated, characterizing its central theme as "a grim and unpleasant study of man's inhumanity toward man".

==== Views on the screenplay's ending ====
Edwin S. Schallert, a fellow critic of Philip Scheuer at the Los Angeles Times, also attended the film's first screening in Los Angeles on December 20, 1957. The following day the newspaper published Schallert's evaluation, which begins by classifying Paths of Glory as "A minor contribution but an interesting one to the war effort on the screen". Next he describes the drama's storyline in some detail before addressing specifically the film's final scene, which he found odd and disconnected in its presentation so soon after "the grim gray execution". "Susanne Christian", Schallert writes, "is seen as the German girl forced to sing to a huge body of [French] troops right at the end of the picture – a peculiar sort of payoff for the miscarriage of justice to which the whole gathering of men seems to be oblivious." He then concludes, "'Paths of Glory' is a commendably sincere picture, very well told for the most part, though it does not fulfill itself in the best screen and entertainment terms. It is practically like a documentary."

The review in Harrison's Reports addressed the ending as well, maintaining that it was the "picture's one weak spot", was "difficult to understand", and "leaves one with a feeling that it is inconclusive". The journal then offered its own interpretation of the final scenes. From Harrison's perspective, as Colonel Dax is returning to his quarters after his confrontations with his superior officers, "he notices his soldiers enjoying themselves in a cafe. It disgusts him to think that they had so quickly forgotten their executed comrades, but he compassionately realizes that life must go on." Whitney Williams in Variety also commented about the film's finale, noting that it "ends so abruptly [the] audience is left with a feeling of incompletion."

Other assorted critics in newspapers and trade publications viewed the film's ending and the production's significance cinematically far differently than the cited critics at the Los Angeles Times or the reviewers for Harrison's Reports and Variety. Richard Gertner of the New York-based trade paper Motion Picture Daily was one of them. He, unlike Edwin Schallert, did not see Paths of Glory as a "minor contribution" to the genre of wartime portrayals. Nor did he find its closing scenes "peculiar"; but instead, "poignant". After viewing what he termed "a brilliant and arresting film" only a few weeks after its world premiere in Munich, Gertner highly recommended it to his readers, many of whom were theater owners. He then advised those motion picture "exhibitors" not to misjudge the film's content in advance:

Technically, this is a war picture, but any exhibitor who promotes it as just another action film will be making a serious mistake. Its exciting battle scenes and the suspense of a subsequent court martial assure it of appeal in that market. But it also has deeper and stronger elements under the surface that will attract customers who like strong drama....Just as exciting as the physical events are the ideas about war and men that Kubrick trenchantly puts across – about military discipline, the [fallibility] of those who carry it out and the futility of attempting to fight [it]. These are timeless ideas – relevant to any war. Let us hasten to add, however, that this is no "message" picture. The theme is implicit to the story and the characters.

Finally, in contrast to Philip Scheuer's omission of the production from his "selection of 1957's best", Gertner ends his appraisal emphatically: "No doubt about it – 'Paths of Glory' is one of the strongest dramas of the year."

==== Opinions regarding Kubrick's direction and editing ====
In spite of issues being raised in various reviews about the film's manner of dialogue, its anticipated marketing challenges, and its ending, in the United States in 1957 and 1958 there was near universal admiration expressed for the directorial abilities and technical expertise that the 29-year-old Kubrick exhibited in the production. Jay Carmody – the drama critic for The Evening Star in Washington, D.C., and winner of the Screen Directors Guild's "Critic of the Year" award for 1956 – commended Kubrick for directing a "film with sting" and doing so with "chilling incisiveness". At the New York Herald Tribune, critic William Zinsser judges the film to be "outstanding" in his December 26, 1957 review and describes Kubrick's direction and editing as first-rate. "His scenes", Zinsser observes, "are vivid and well composed, and he knows the art of cutting – the scenes make their point, with economy and bite, and move on." Even at this relatively early stage in Kubrick's career directing feature films, he had already gained a reputation in the motion picture industry for commanding all aspects of his projects and being, as one colleague described him, "'meticulous with everything, from scripting to editing'". What is notably missing, however, from Zinsser's comments or in other contemporary reviews about the quality of the production's "cutting" are any allusions to Eva Kroll, the film's credited editor, and to her contributions in helping to construct or at least refine the end product.

=== Later reactions and references to the film ===
More than three decades after the release of Paths of Glory, American director Robert Zemeckis paid homage to the film with the 1991 Tales from the Crypt episode "Yellow". The episode was an adaptation of the 1952 Shock SuspenStories story, "Yellow!", about a U.S. Army colonel whose son, a lieutenant, exhibits cowardice and is sentenced to face the firing squad. The father makes the son falsely believe that the firing squad will be firing blanks, so that the son will not exhibit cowardice before his execution. Zemeckis cast Kirk Douglas and his son Eric Douglas in the father and son roles.

David Simon, creator of the critically acclaimed television series The Wire (2002—2008), has said that Paths of Glory was a key influence on the HBO crime drama. The influence of the film comes in its depiction of the tribulations of "middle management", in the form of Dax's unsuccessful attempt to protect his troops against the inhumane ambitions of his superiors, which in turn influenced The Wire 's depiction of various institutions acting against individuals.

Chicago Sun-Times critic Roger Ebert added the film to his "Great Movies" list on February 25, 2005. Years earlier, on a 1987 episode of the televised film review series At the Movies, critic Gene Siskel of the Chicago Tribune debated with co-host Ebert about the respective merits of several Kubrick productions. Siskel in their discussions declared Paths of Glory to be "a near perfect film," one that in his opinion was surpassed in overall quality only by Kubrick's dark comedy Dr. Strangelove.

An indication of the film's enduring popularity can be found on the American review-aggregation website Rotten Tomatoes. As of March 2025, the film holds a 96% rating based on 114 reviews with an average rating of 9.2/10. The site's critical consensus reads, "Paths of Glory is a transcendentally humane war movie from Stanley Kubrick, with impressive, protracted battle sequences and a knock-out ending." On Metacritic, the film has a score of 90 out of 100 based on reviews from 18 critics, indicating "universal acclaim".

== Preservation and restoration ==
In 1992, the film was deemed "culturally, historically or aesthetically significant" by the Library of Congress and selected for preservation in the United States National Film Registry. In October and November 2004 the film was shown at the London Film Festival by the British Film Institute. It was carefully remastered over a period of several years; the original film elements were found to be damaged. However, with the aid of several modern digital studios in Los Angeles the film was completely restored and remastered for modern cinema. In addition, Stanley Kubrick's widow Christiane (who also appears in the closing scene as the German singer) made a guest appearance at the start of the performance.

== Home media ==
Paths of Glory was released on VHS on July 21, 1997, followed by the DVD version on June 29, 1999. The Criterion Collection's first release of the film was for a Laserdisc release in 1989. The film was released on DVD and Blu-ray by The Criterion Collection with a high-definition digital transfer on October 26, 2010. Eureka released a UK Region B Blu-Ray in 2016 as part of its Masters of Cinema line.

In 2022, Kino Lorber detailed their upcoming 4K Blu-ray release of the film, restored from the original camera negative. This release also features an audio commentary by critic Tim Lucas. This edition was released on August 23, 2022.

On June 22, 2026, The Criterion Collection announced that the film would be a part of The Complete Kubrick 4K box set.

== See also ==
- 1917 French Army mutinies
- List of American films of 1957
- List of films considered the best
