= San Quentin (1937 film) =

1937 drama film directed by Lloyd Bacon

- Directed by: Lloyd Bacon
- Written by: Robert Tasker; John Bright
- Screenplay by: Peter Milne; Humphrey Cobb; Charles Belden; Laird Doyle; Seton I. Miller; Tom Reed
- Produced by: Jack L. Warner; Hal Wallis; Samuel Bischoff
- Starring: Pat O'Brien; Humphrey Bogart; Ann Sheridan
- Cinematography: Sidney Hickox
- Edited by: William Holmes
- Music by: Leo Forbstein
- Distributed by: Warner Bros. Pictures
- Release date: August 7, 1937
- Running time: 70 minutes
- Country: United States
- Language: English
- Budget: $365,000 (estimated)

San Quentin is a 1937 Warner Bros. drama film directed by Lloyd Bacon and starring Pat O'Brien, Humphrey Bogart, and Ann Sheridan. It was shot on location at San Quentin State Prison.

== Plot ==
Ex-Army officer Steve Jameson, chief guard at San Quentin State Prison, meets San Francisco night club singer May Kennedy. Her brother, Joe "Red" Kennedy, is on the run from the police and is arrested when he visits her.

Red arrives in San Quentin and fights hardened criminal "Sailor Boy" Hansen in the courtyard on his first day. Jameson punishes him. May begins a romantic relationship with Jameson, and finds out he is the yard captain in charge of the prisoners.

Jameson institutes a system to separate the hapless lawbreakers from the hardened criminals, and assigns Joe work outside of the prison in a road construction camp. Former chief guard Lieutenant Druggin resents Jameson, and surreptitiously assigns Hansen to the road camp as well. Hansen makes a plan to break out of prison. Red refuses to join him but changes his mind upon learning that Jameson is dating his sister.

Hansen's girlfriend arrives at the construction site and asks for help with a flat tire. Hansen volunteers and retrieves two guns hidden in the tool box. He and Red take a guard hostage and flee. After a car chase, Hansen's car crashes. He dies while Red escapes and goes to May's flat, but Jameson is already there. Red shoots at Jameson, slightly injuring him, and is shot by a police patrol. He has just enough strength to get back to the prison gates. Before dying, he asks the guards to tell Jameson he came back, and says the cons should respect Jameson.

== Cast ==
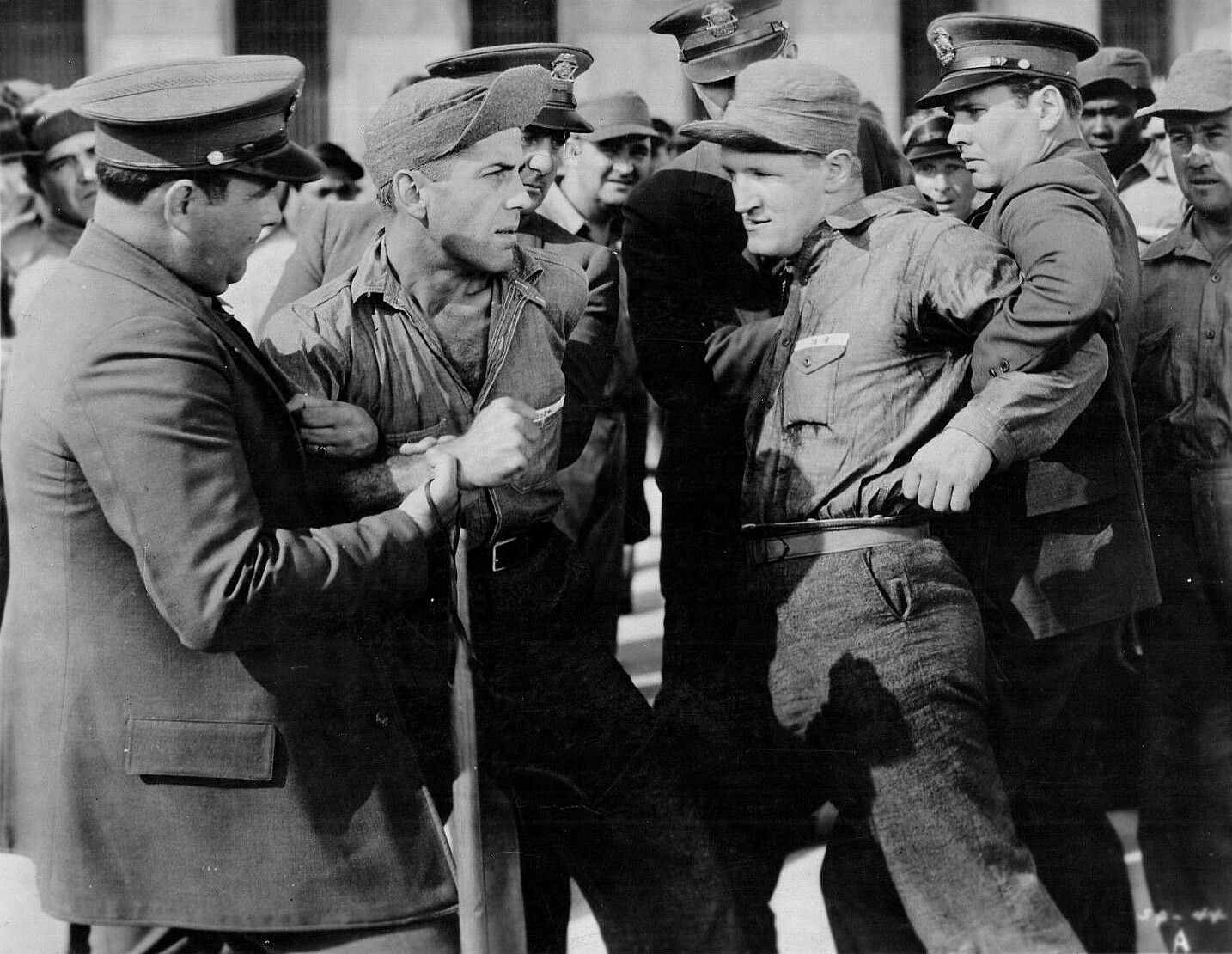
Humphrey Bogart and Joe Sawyer in San Quentin

- Pat O'Brien as Capt. Stephen Jameson
- Humphrey Bogart as Joe 'Red' Kennedy
- Ann Sheridan as May Kennedy
- Barton MacLane as Lt. Druggin
- Joe Sawyer as "Sailor Boy" Hansen (credited as Joseph Sawyer)
- Veda Ann Borg as Helen
- Archie Robbins as Mickey Callahan (credited as James Robbins)
- Joe King as Warden Taylor (credited as Joseph King)
- Gordon Oliver as Captain
- Garry Owen as Dopey
- Marc Lawrence as Venetti
- Emmett Vogan as Lieutenant
- William Pawley as Convict
- Al Hill as Convict
- Max Wagner as Prison Runner
- George Lloyd as Convict
- Ernie Adams as Fink
- Pat Flaherty as Cop clearing May (uncredited)
- Edward Keane as 2nd Detective (uncredited)

== Critical reception ==
Harrison's Reports described the film as a "fast-moving, prison melodrama with plentiful action." It wrote that it was "good entertainment" that was given "authentic flavor" by the inclusion of shots that were filmed at the actual prison.
