= Joseph Tissier =

Joseph-Marie Tissier
- (Arch)Bishop of Châlons
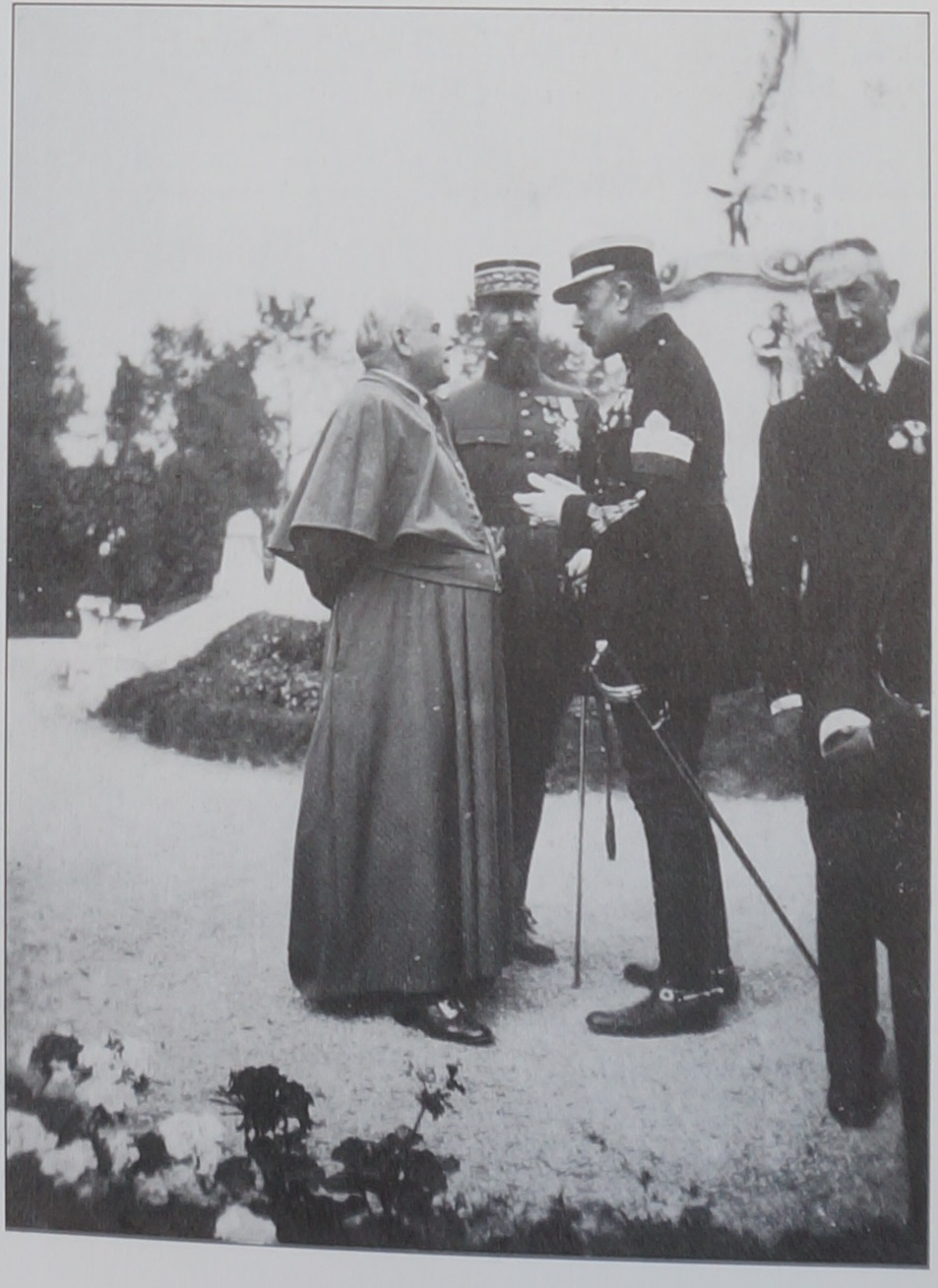
- Tissier (left) and General Gouraud (right) at Châlons
- Church: Catholic Church
- Diocese: Diocese of Châlons
- In office: 20 December 1912 – 9 January 1948
- Predecessor: Hector Sévin
- Successor: René-Joseph Piérard

Orders
- Ordination: 18 December 1880
- Consecration: 24 February 1913 by Henri-Louis Bouquet

Personal details
- Born: 14 August 1857 La Ferté-Beauharnais, Loir-et-Cher, French Empire
- Died: 9 January 1948 (aged 90)

Joseph-Marie Tissier was bishop of Châlons in France from 1912–1948. He dedicated the ossuary and memorial in Souain-Perthes-lès-Hurlus that holds the remains of 130 members of the French Foreign Legion who died in the Second Battle of Champagne.
