= Souain corporals affair =

1915 unjust French Army executions

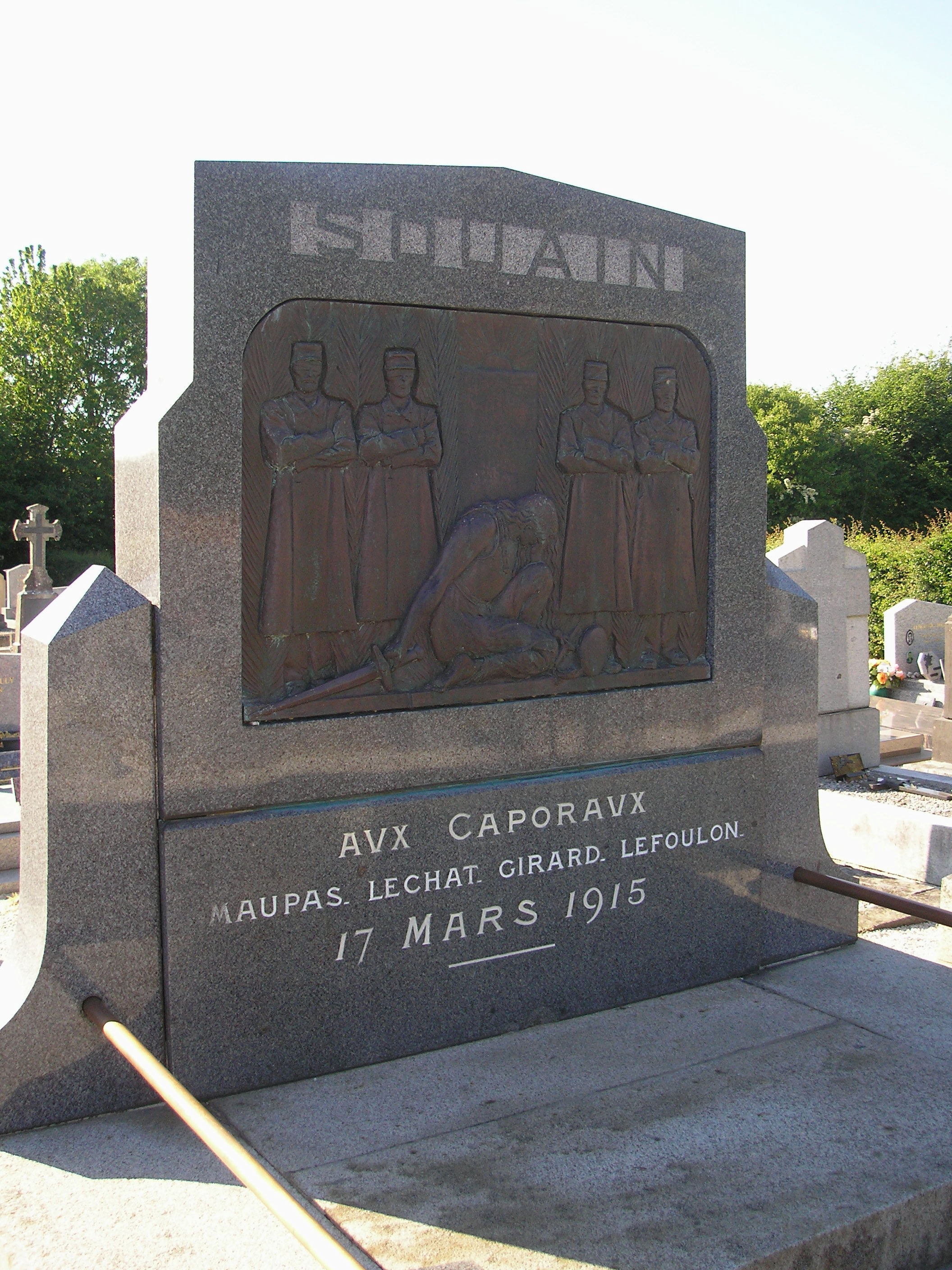
The memorial to the four executed corporals at Sartilly, in Normandy

The Souain corporals affair ([swɛ̃]; French: Affaire des caporaux de Souain) was an incident where four corporals in the French Army were shot by firing squad as an example to the rest of their companies during the First World War. The executions, which occurred in the vicinity of Souain on 17 March 1915, are considered to be the most egregious and most publicized military injustice during World War I in France. The events inspired the 1935 anti-war novel Paths of Glory by Humphrey Cobb, later adapted into a film by Stanley Kubrick.

== Background ==
In March 1915, units of the French Army holding a section of the Western Front through Champagne had seen no tangible results despite two months of fighting. After two recent unsuccessful attacks, the 21st Company of the 336th Infantry Regiment (part of the 60th Infantry Division) was ordered by Général de division Géraud Réveilhac to retake positions captured by the Germans north of the village of Souain in the Marne. A bayonet assault would begin at 5 am on March 10 against a stretch of enemy trenches that was heavily defended by machine guns and barbed wire. Several unsuccessful attacks had already left this part of No Man's Land strewn with French dead.

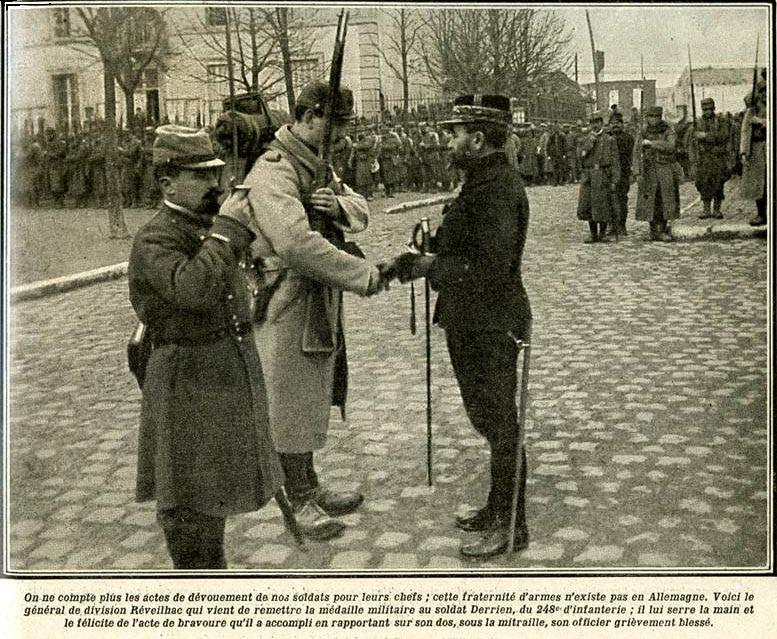
General Géraud Réveilhac making a medal presentation in 1915

However, on the morning of the planned assault, a preceding artillery barrage dropped shells on the French trenches instead of the German lines. That also ploughed up the ground over which the assault troops were ordered to cross.

When the first wave of troops started "going over the top," most became casualties of the undamaged enemy machine guns. The remaining soldiers of 21st Company, who were both exhausted after days of front line duty from slow troop rotation early in the war and demoralized by failure, refused to leave their trenches. On hearing that the troops were refusing to attack, General Réveilhac ordered his divisional artillery to bombard their positions to force them out of their trenches. The divisions's commanding artillery officer, Colonel Raoul Berube, refused to obey without a written order, and Réveilhac declined to issue one.

With the failure of the assault he had ordered, Réveilhac demanded that action be taken against the soldiers of the 21st company. Its company commander, Captain Equilbey, was ordered to produce a list of names that included six corporals and 18 privates chosen from the two youngest members in every squad.

On March 15, Réveilhac announced that all 24 men would be court-martialed as an example to the others.

== Court-martial ==
The trial was based on the interpretation of the French Army's Code of Military Regulations, which was implemented on September 6, 1914:

...la discipline faisant la force principale des armées, il importe que tout supérieur obtienne de ses subordonnés une obéissance entière et une soumission de tous les instants.

...discipline being the main strength of armies, it is important for every superior to receive subordinates' entire obedience and submission at all times.

The code also established war-time tribunals that employed a panel of three judges who would decide the case. No appeal of the decision was allowed. Sentences were carried out very quickly, usually the day after the judgement. Such courts martial were abolished on April 24, 1916.

On March 16, 1915, the tribunal was convened under the auspices of the 60th Infantry Division. General Réveilhac opened the case by stating it was about his troops' "refusal to leap out of the trenches," but Corporal Théophile Maupas, one of the defendants, refuted the claim: "anyone there had the choice of being killed by the shells from our side or by the fire of the German machine gunners." Nevertheless, the verdict of the tribunal was to sentence all 24 defendants to death.

However, the 18 enlisted men received a stay of execution on the grounds that they were arbitrarily chosen from the ranks, and two corporals, named Gosselin and Lorin, were shown clemency because they had not heard the order to attack. Only four corporals, three from Manche and the fourth from Brittany, did not have their death sentences commuted:

- Louis Victor François Girard, aged 28, born October 2, 1886, in Blainville, clockmaker, living in Paris, 17th arrondissement, married, one child
- Lucien Auguste Pierre Raphaël Lechat, aged 23, born April 22, 1891, in Ferré, Ille-et-Vilaine, waiter in a cafe in Vitré, single
- Louis Albert Lefoulon, aged 30, born August 17, 1884, in Condé-sur-Vire, Manche, railway worker, living with a partner, one child
- Théophile Maupas, aged 40, born June 3, 1874, in Montgardon, Manche, worked in the town hall in Chefresne, married, two children.

In early afternoon, the next day, the four men were executed by firing squad in front of the 336th Infantry Regiment. Two hours after the executions, the French High Command commuted their death sentences to forced labour.

== Posthumous pardon ==
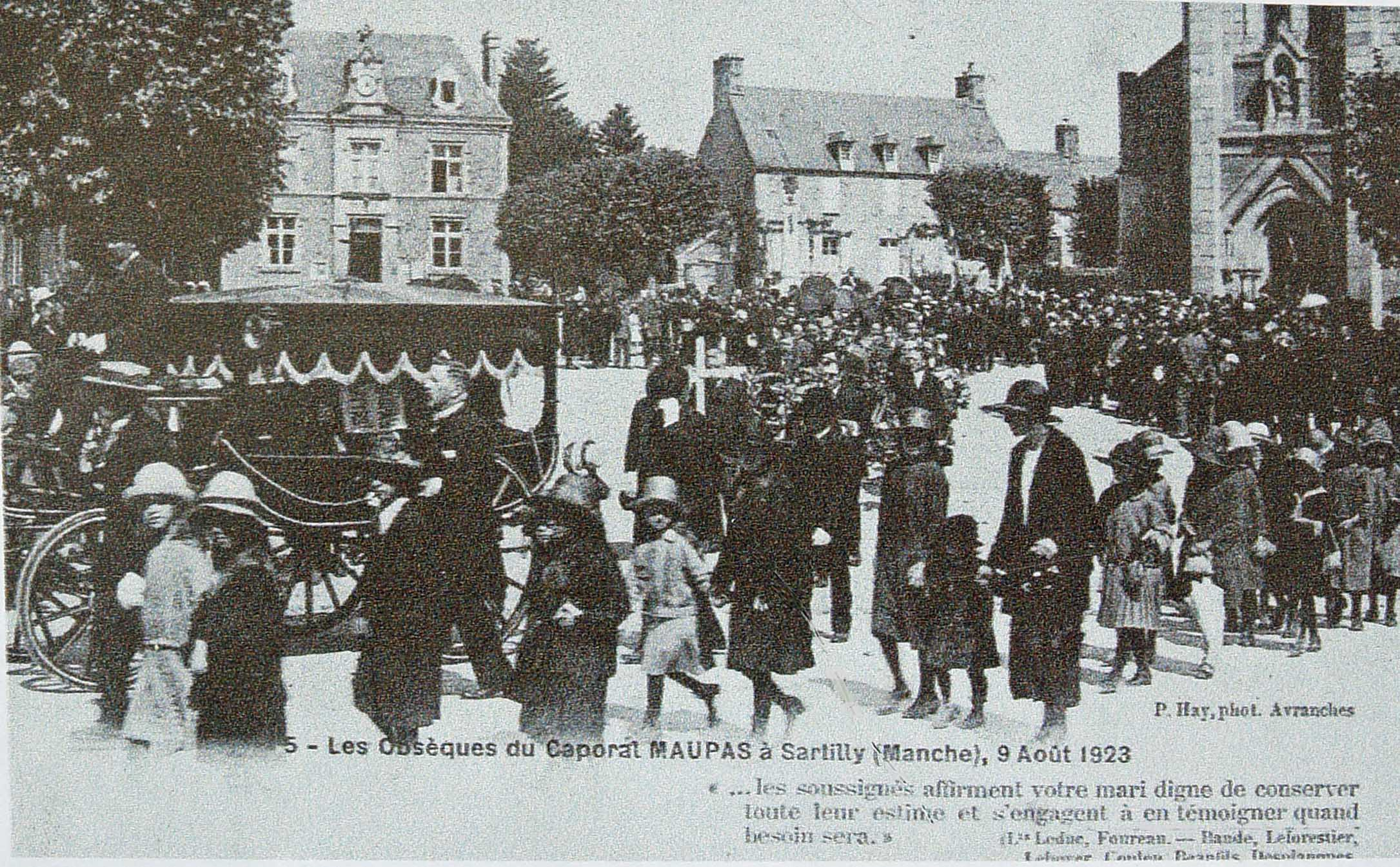
The funeral of Corporal Théophile Maupas on 9 August 1923 at Sartilly in Normandy

In April 1915, Blanche Maupas, the widow of Théophile Maupas, contacted the League of Human Rights (La Ligue des droits de l'Homme) about the execution of her husband. She then began a two-decade-long fight to have her husband's and other men's convictions annulled. On April 11, 1920 France's Ministry of Justice refused to review the case. On March 26, 1922 and April 21, 1926, a folder concerning the Souain corporals was rejected by France's Court of Cassation. Despite these setbacks, Blanche Maupas created the "Maupas Committee" (Comité Maupas) which became the Comité national pour la réhabilitation des victimes de guerre (National Committee for the rehabilitation of war victims) in 1928.

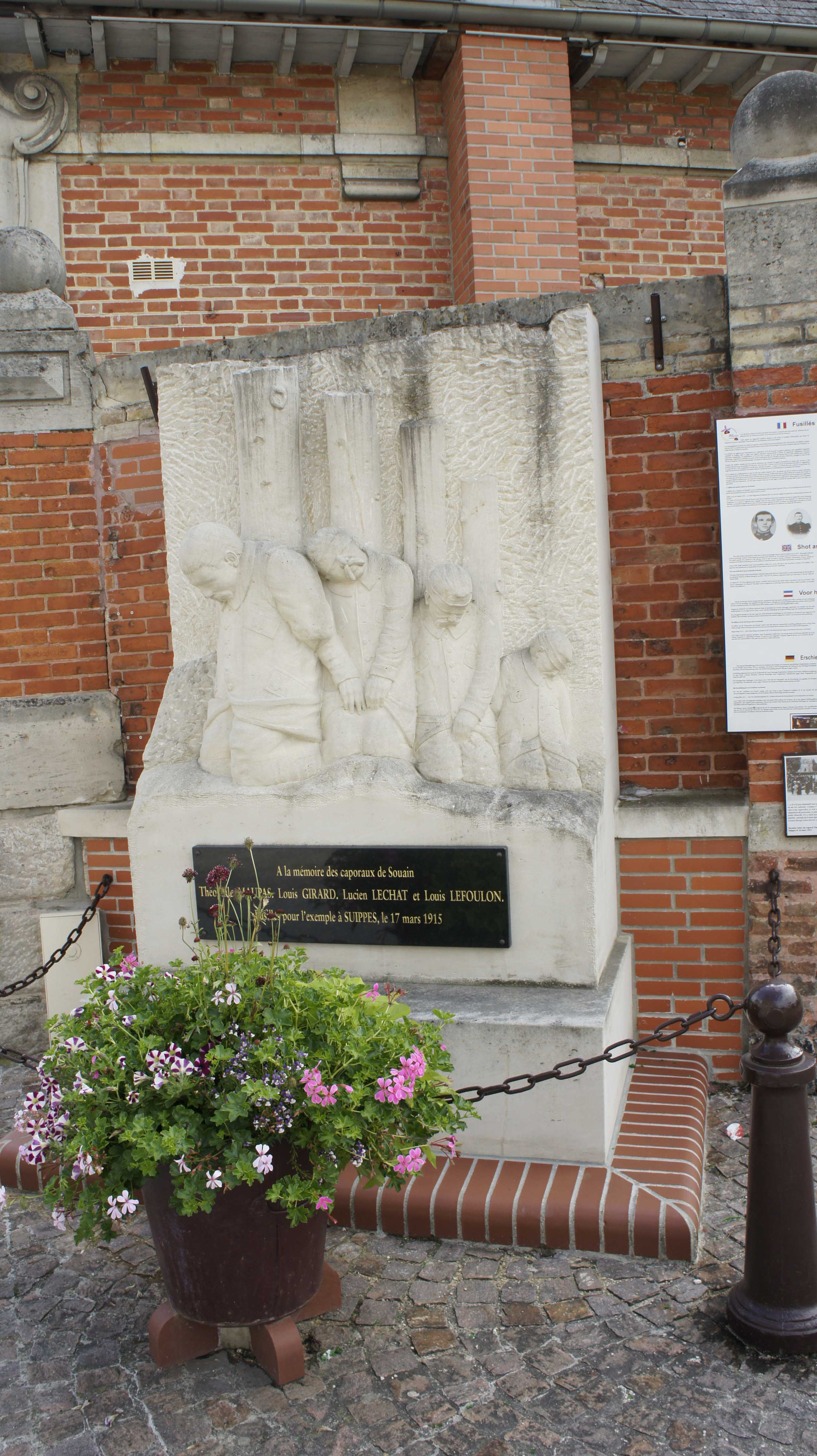
Memorial at Suippes

Eulalie Lechat, the sister of Corporal Lucien Lechat, also established a committee in 1923 with the help of the League of Human Rights. Her brother was re-interred in a cemetery at Le Ferré, Brittany on October 16, 1924. Together the widows Maupas and Lechat hosted and organized meetings throughout France. They also got stories in the regional and national press. Many supporters were from the associations for war veterans. Protests were held outside the Chamber of Deputies in the Luxembourg Palace, Paris asking for posthumous pardons for the Corporals of Souain.

Eventually on March 3, 1934, almost 19 years after they were shot, a judge at the Cour spéciale de justice (Special Court of Justice) agreed to exonerate the four corporals. He concluded that the order had been "impracticable" and the "sacrifice" exceeded "the limits of human strength". Therefore, with "some doubt on the willingness [...] to commit disobedience for which they were convicted, they can not be held criminally responsible". The Special courts, which – for parity – had benches made up of both judges and veterans' representatives, had been established in 1932 to re-examine the decisions and sentences made by the French military's wartime tribunals.

Following the corporals' exoneration, their families received a symbolic franc in damages, and were able to claim the mens' pension rights.

== Legacy ==
The events inspired the 1935 anti-war novel Paths of Glory by Humphrey Cobb, which was the basis of the 1957 American film of the same name by Stanley Kubrick. A made-for-television movie titled Blanche Maupas, directed by Patrick Jamain, was released in 2009. French actress Romane Bohringer played the title character.

In 1925, a monument was erected in memory of the Corporals of Souain inside Sartilly cemetery, where Théophile Maupas was re-interred in 1923. On December 1, 2007, a monument to the Corporals of Souain was unveiled in Suippes in Marne. Streets in Villeurbanne and Bréhal are named in Maupas's honour. A school in Sartilly has been named Théophile Maupas since 1998.

== Bibliography ==
- Laisné, Jacqueline (1994). Pour l'honneur de Théo et des caporaux de Souain. Isoète.
- Maupas, Blanche (1962). Le Fusillé. Isoèteen.
- Andraud, Henry (1935). Quand on fusillait les innocents. Gallimard.
- Bach, André (2003). Fusillés pour l'exemple - 1914-1915. Tallandier.
- Offenstadt, Nicolas (1999). Les Fusillés de la Grande Guerre et la mémoire collective. Paris: Odile Jacob.
- Audoin-Rouzeau, Stéphane (2001). Cher martyr, tu seras vengé. Noesis.
- Alègre, Jean-Paul (1998). Blanche Maupas, l'amour fusillé. l'Avant-Scène.
- Monclin, Roger (1934). Les Damnés de la Guerre.
- Réau, R.-G (1925). Les Crimes des conseils de guerre. Paris: Progrès Civique.
- Cobb, Humphrey (1935). Paths of Glory.
