= Over the top =

Over the top may refer to:

- The concept of moving around something or someone by going over it
- An expression labelling something as excessive or so exaggerated that it seems far removed from logic.

== Film and television ==
- Over-the-top media service, streaming platforms that deliver video and audio content over the Internet, bypassing the traditional methods of content distribution
  - Over-the-top media services in India
- Over the Top (1918 film), film based on 1917 book of same name, by Arthur Guy Empey
- Over the Top (1987 film), an action drama film starring Sylvester Stallone
- Over the Top (TV series), a 1997 TV series starring Tim Curry and Steve Carell
- "Over The Top", an episode of Regular Show
- Big Brother: Over the Top, a digital spin-off series of the U.S. version of Big Brother
- Bigg Boss OTT, a digital spin-off series of the Indian version of Big Brother
  - Bigg Boss OTT (Hindi Digital series), the Hindi-language version
  - Bigg Boss OTT (Kannada TV series), the Kannadauage version
- OTT, a late night spin-off of Tiswas hosted by Chris Tarrant

== Music ==
=== Albums ===
- Over the Top (Cozy Powell album) or the title song, 1979
- Over the Top (Infinite album) or the title song, 2011
- Over the Top (White Wizzard album) or the title song, 2010
- Over the Top: The Rarities, by Motörhead, or the 1979 title song (see below), 2000
- Over the Top, by Mountain, 1995
- Over the Top, by Mentors, 2005, or its title song
- Over the Top, by TWRP, 2020

=== Songs ===
- "Over the Top" (1917 song), a World War I song written by Marion Phelps and Maxwell Goldman
- "Over the Top: Military March", a 1917 World War I song written by Geoffrey O'Hara
- "Over the Top" (Led Zeppelin song), or "Moby Dick", 1969
- "Over the Top" (Smiley song), 2021
- "Over the Top", by Battle Beast from Battle Beast, 2013
- "Over the Top", by Hey! Say! JUMP, 2017
- "Over the Top", by Motörhead from Bomber (non-album single), 1979
- "Over the Top", by Pete Townshend from The Iron Man: The Musical by Pete Townshend, 1989
- "Over the Top", by Raven from Rock Until You Drop, 1981

== Other ==
- "Going over the top", to climb out of the trenches into harm's way in the trench warfare of the First World War
- Over the Top Cube, 17x17x17 former world record largest Rubik's Cube invented by Oskar van Deventer
- Over the Top, a 1921 sculpture by John Paulding depicting a World War I infantryman and used in several war memorials across the United States
- Over the Top (painting), a painting of a counter-attack during trench warfare in World War I by the war artist John Nash
- Over the Top Wrestling, Irish wrestling promotion
- Over the Top, 2019 memoir by Jonathan Van Ness
- Over the Top Records, a Universal Music Japan label
