= Humphrey Cobb =

American novelist (1899–1944)

- Born: September 5, 1899; Siena, Kingdom of Italy
- Died: April 25, 1944 (aged 44); New York, USA
- Occupations: writer screenwriter
- Notable work: Paths of Glory (1935)
- Spouse: Annie Louise Hubbard
- Children: 2
- Parents: Arthur Cobb (father); Alice Littell Cobb (mother)
- Military service
- Allegiance: Canada
- Branch: Canadian Army
- Service years: 1916-1918
- Conflicts: World War One; Battle of Amiens

Humphrey Cobb (September 5, 1899 – April 25, 1944) was an Italian-born, Canadian-American screenwriter and novelist. He is known for writing the novel Paths of Glory (1935), which was made into an acclaimed 1957 anti-war film Paths of Glory by Stanley Kubrick. Cobb was also the lead screenwriter on the 1937 film San Quentin, starring Humphrey Bogart.

== Early life and military service ==
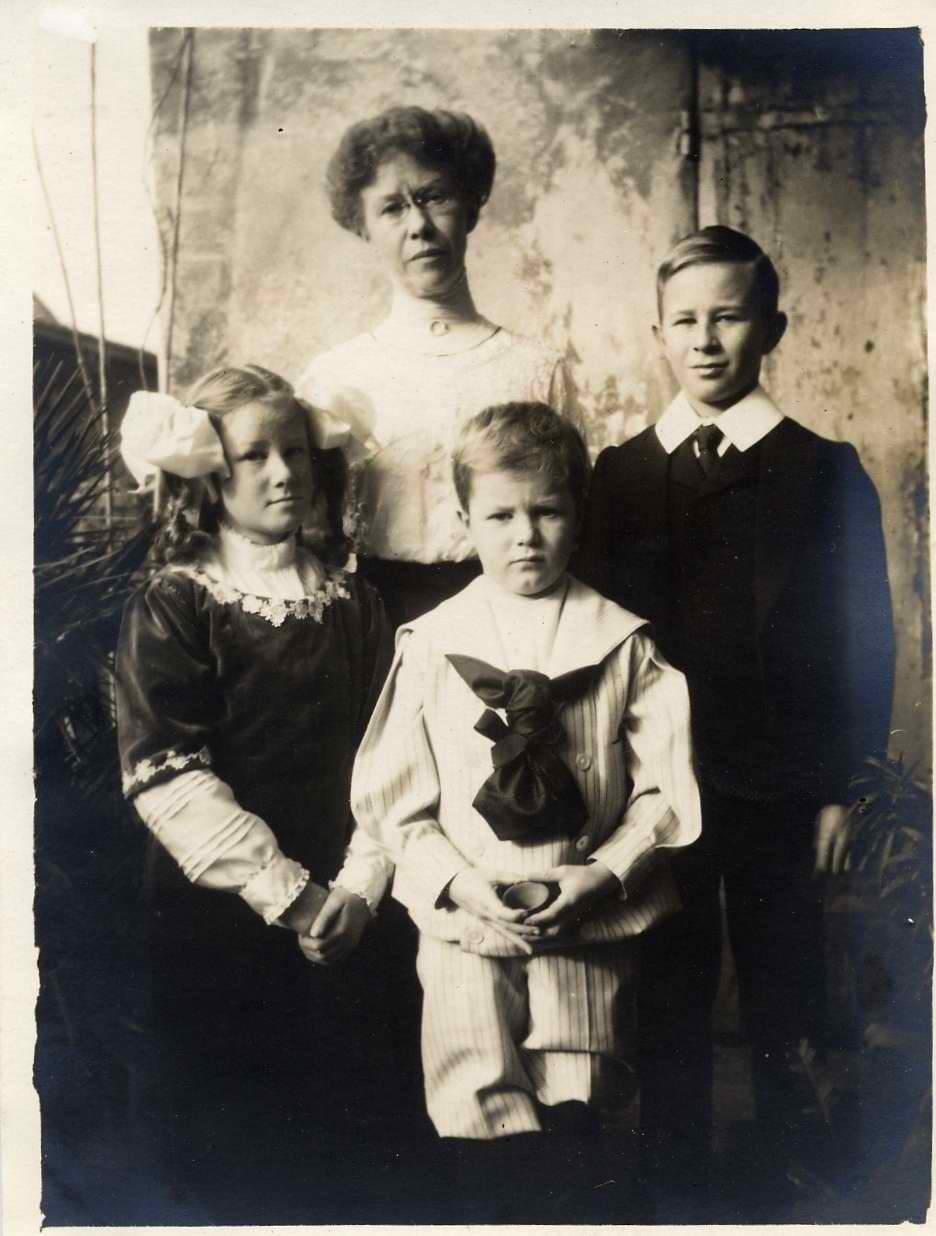
Humphrey (right) with his recently widowed mother, Alice Littell Cobb, M.D.; his younger sister Alice; and little brother Arthur at the Casa Guida in Florence, Italy, December 24, 1908

Humphrey Cobb was born in Siena, Italy. He was the son of American parents, Arthur Cobb, an artist, and his wife Alice Littell Cobb, a physician. Cobb's parents sent him to school in England for his primary education and at age 13 he returned to the United States to continue his schooling.

In 1916, after being expelled from high school at age 17, Cobb relocated to Montreal, Canada to enlist in the Canadian Army a year before the United States entered World War I. He served for three years during the conflict, including duty on the front lines at the Battle of Amiens in France in 1918.

== Writer ==
Following the war, Cobb worked a variety of jobs. He worked in the stock trade, merchant marine, publishing, advertising, and the US Office of War Information writing overseas propaganda. He wrote Paths of Glory while working at the Young & Rubicam advertising agency in New York. The story is about three French soldiers who are court martialed and executed to save senior commanders from shame. The book was based on the Souain corporals affair, an actual event in WWI when the French Army shot four men for cowardice as an example to others.

Cobb wrote a second less well received novel, None But the Brave, which was serialized in Collier's Weekly in 1938. From 1935 to 1940 he was employed as a screenwriter where he was credited as a co-writer of San Quentin (1937).

== Personal life ==
Cobb married Annie Louise Hubbard. They had two children, William and Alice. His sister was Dr. Virginia Cobb.

== Death ==
Cobb died of coronary thrombosis at his home in Port Washington, New York on April 25, 1944. At the time of his death, he was an advertising copywriter for the New York firm of Kenyon & Eckhardt.
