= Holt tractors of the First World War =

Tractor models used by WWI Allies

During the First World War, a number of different tracked tractors designed and produced by the Holt Manufacturing Company were used by the forces of the United States, the British Empire and France.

Britain was the first military customer of Holt during the war, placing orders in 1914 soon after war was declared. Initially the militaries of the British Empire used their Holt tractors to tow heavy artillery, and later expanded their employment to include resupply and logistics. Before their entry into the war, the United States too purchased Holt tractors, utilising them to tow trailers of supplies during Pancho Villa Expedition in 1916–17. American analysis during the war determined they required five separate tracked tractor classes for the mechanisation of artillery and logistics, 2½-ton, 5-ton, 10-ton, 15-ton and 20-ton. The Holt 75 and Holt 120 were used for the 15-ton and 20-ton classes, whilst fresh designs were created by Holt, in collaboration with the Rock Island Arsenal, for the 2½-ton, 5-ton and 10-ton classes.

Historian Reynold M. Wik calculated Holt's wartime output of tractors to be 5,072, of which almost 2,100 were sold directly to the European allies. To achieve this, throughout the course of the war Holt expanded significantly to meet the demand for their machines, employing 2,100 workers at one point. Despite this, Holt was incapable of producing enough tractors to meet demand and late in the war licence production of Holt tractors was undertaken by the Chandler, Maxwell and REO companies in America, as well as Ruston & Hornsby in the United Kingdom.

== Holt 75 ==
Holt 75
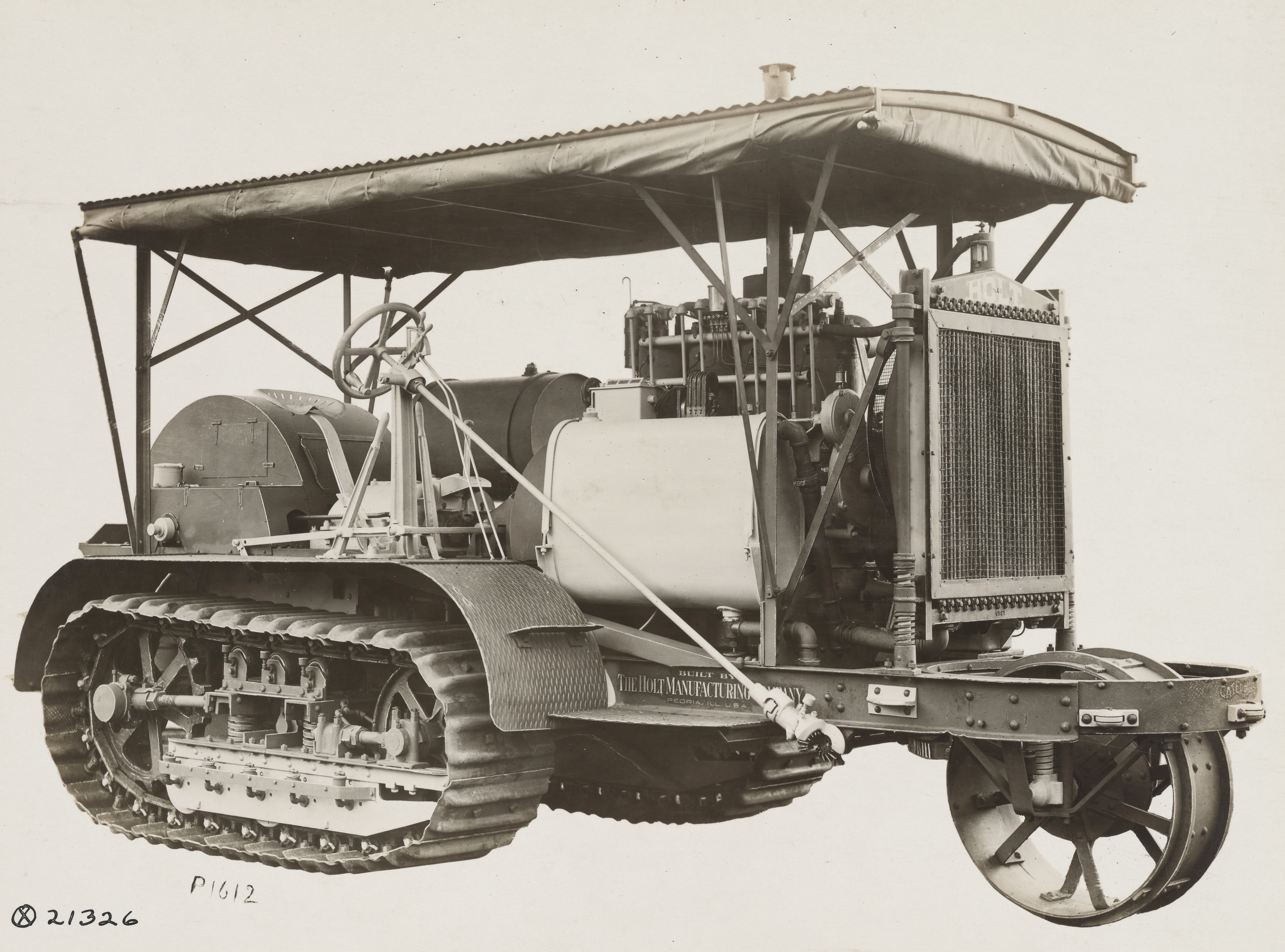
- Production: 1913–1924 (4,620 built)
- Length: 20 ft (6.1 m)
- Weight: 11.8 short tons (10.5 long tons; 10.7 t)
- Engine model: Holt M-7 4-cylinder petrol 1,412 cu in (23.1 L); 75 hp (56 kW) at 550 rpm
- Transmission: 2 forward, 1 reverse
- Speed: 2 mph (3.2 km/h) laden 5 mph (8.05 km/h) unladen

The Holt 75 (Model T-8) was a 15-ton tractor, it was used by the militaries of the United States and the British Empire during the war.

Introduced in 1913, the Holt 75 was a commercial design developed from the preceding smaller Holt 60. Britain was the first military customer of the Holt 75, 1,805 were purchased by the British War Office during the war. In the service of the British Empire the Holt 75 was used to tow medium and heavy artillery pieces such as the 60-pounder gun, 6-inch 26 cwt howitzer, 6-inch gun, 8-inch howitzer and 9.2-inch howitzer, as well as to tow trailers for resupply operations. In American service the Holt 75 was used as both an artillery tractor and for resupply, 267 were purchased of which a number were used during the Pancho Villa Expedition and 232 were sent to France.

The Holt 75 was 20 ft (6.1 m) in length and weighed 11.8 short tons (10.5 long tons; 10.7 t), driven by continuous tracks it had a tiller wheel at the front for steering and stability, a feature common to Holt tractors at that time. It was powered by a Holt M-7 4-cylinder petrol engine which had a capacity of 1,412 cu in (23.1 L) and a bore and stroke of 7 1/2 and 8 in (190 and 200 mm), producing 75 hp (56 kW) at 550 rpm. The Holt 75 had a two speed transmission, maximum speed was 2 mph (3.2 km/h) when towing a load and 5 mph (8.05 km/h) unladen.

When production of the Holt 75 ceased in 1924, approximately 4,620 had been produced including 442 produced by Ruston, Proctor & Co in the United Kingdom.

== Holt 120 ==
Holt 120
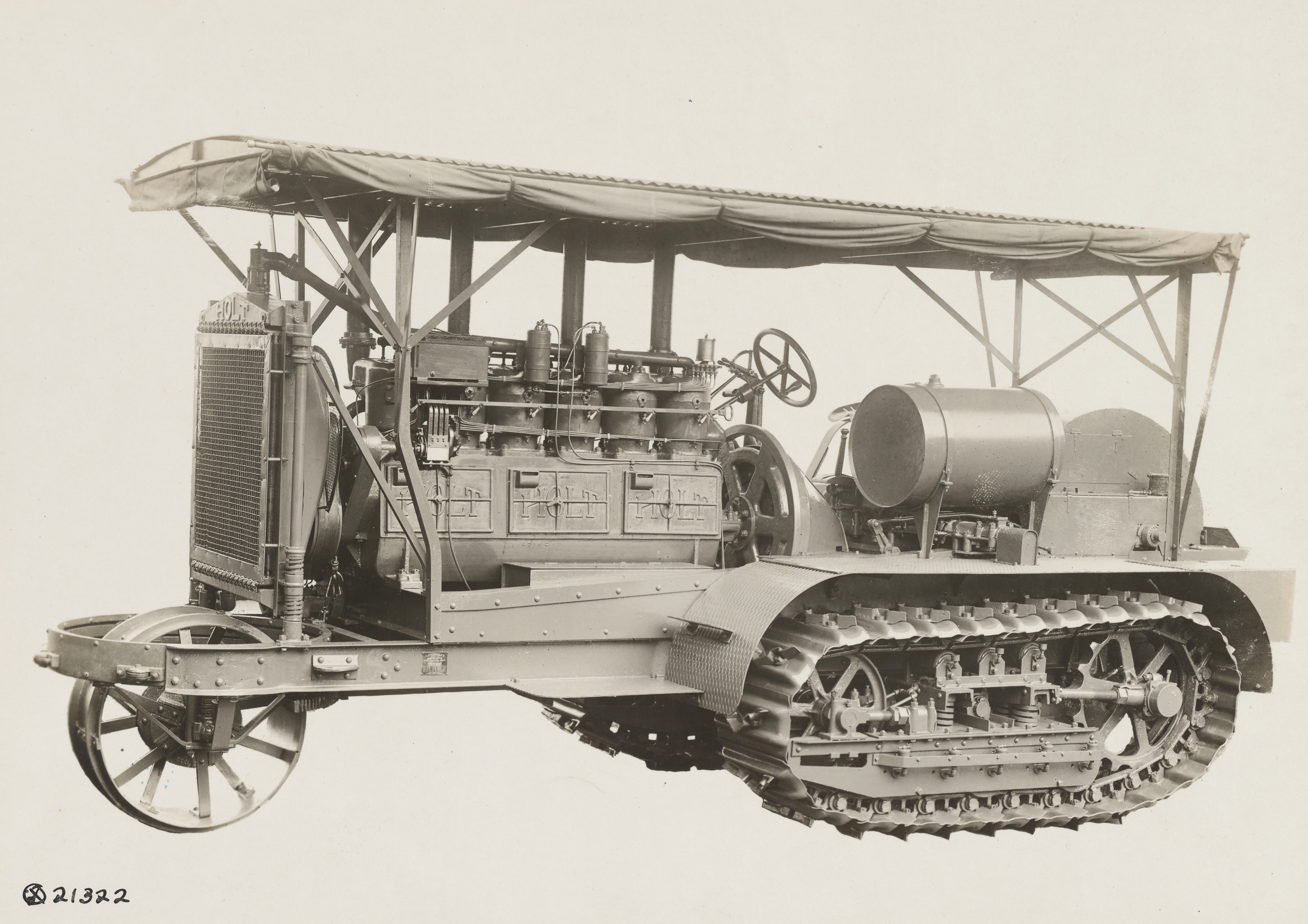
- Production: 1914–1922 (698 built)
- Length: 21 ft (6.4 m)
- Weight: 13.5 short tons (12.1 long tons; 12.2 t)
- Engine model: Holt M-8 6-cylinder petrol 2,119 cu in (34.7 L); 120 hp (89 kW) at 600 rpm
- Transmission: 2 forward, 1 reverse
- Speed: 3.27 mph (5.26 km/h)

The Holt 120 (Model T-9) was a 20-ton tractor, it used by the militaries of the United States and the British Empire during the war.

Tested in 1914 and produced from 1915, the Holt 120 was designed at the request of the US government to tow heavy artillery. 433 Holt 120s were delivered to the US military, and 243 to the militaries of the British Empire. In service they were found to be less effective than the smaller Holt 75.

The Holt 120 was 21 ft (6.4 m) in length and weighed 13.5 short tons (12.1 long tons; 12.2 t), it retained the tiller wheel of the Holt 75 and shared many components with the latter. It was powered by a Holt M-8 6-cylinder petrol engine which had a capacity of 2,119 cu in (34.7 L) and a bore and stroke of 7 1/2 and 8 in (190 and 200 mm), producing 120 hp (89 kW) at 600 rpm. The Holt 120 had a two speed transmission, maximum speed was 2.3 mph (3.7 km/h) in first gear and 3.27 mph (5.3 km/h) in second gear.

When production of the Holt 120 ceased in 1922, 698 had been produced.

== Holt 45 ==
Holt 45
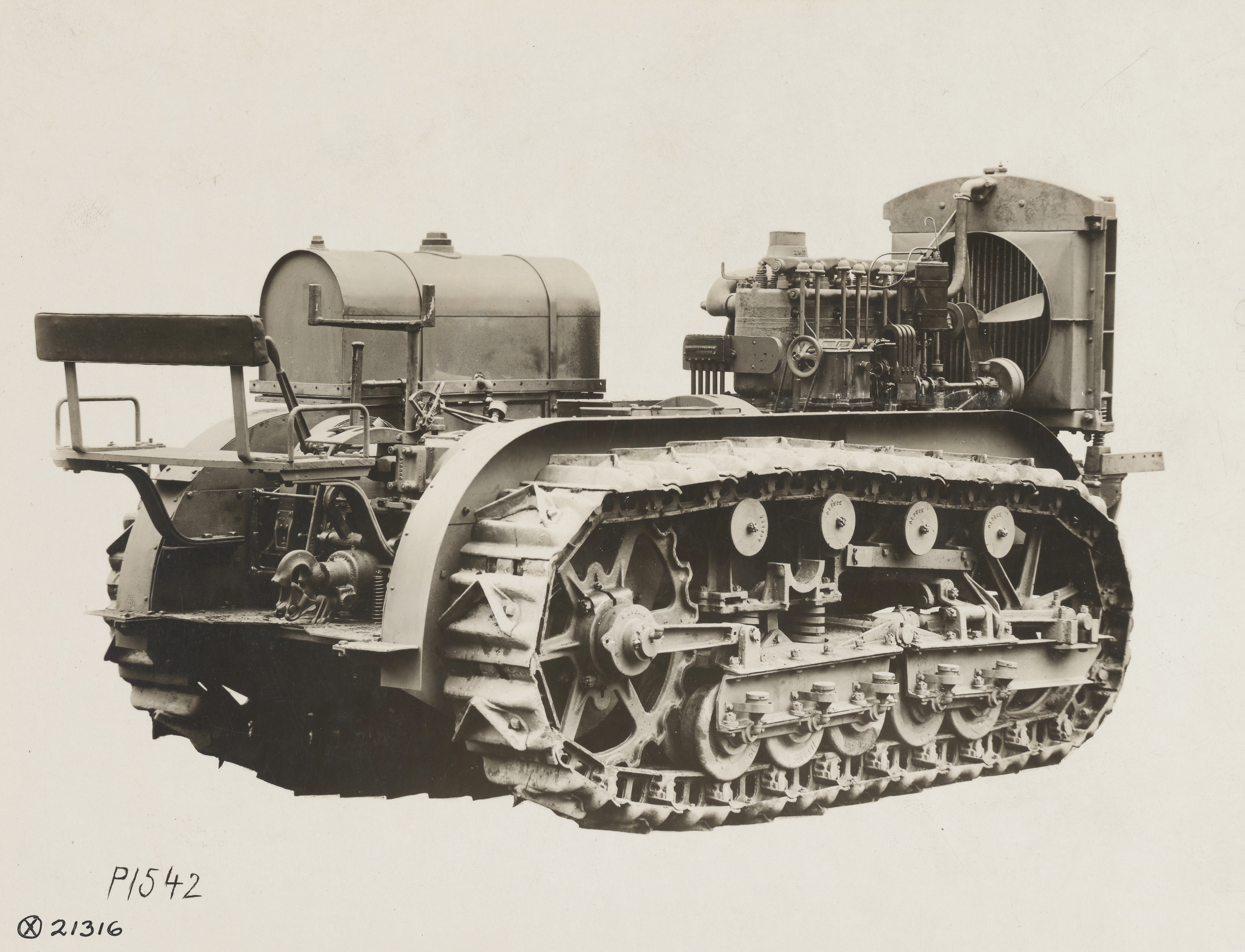
- Production: 1914–1920 (1,891 built)
- Weight: 7 short tons (6.3 long tons; 6.4 t)
- Engine model: Holt M-9 4-cylinder petrol 45 hp (34 kW) at 600 rpm
- Transmission: 2 forward, 1 reverse
- Speed: 2.92 mph (4.7 km/h)

The Holt 45 (Model T-10), also known as the "Baby Holt" or "Muley", was a 5-ton tractor, it was used by the militaries of the United States and France during the war.

The Holt 45 was produced from 1914, initially it was designed for the commercial market. During the war the US military initially ordered 1,800 Holt 45s, although they were supplanted in production for the military by the 5-ton and 10-ton Artillery Tractors. In US service they served with both the US Army and the USMC and were used to tow medium artillery pieces such as the 155 mm Schneider model 1917 howitzer, and to tow stores. A special version of the Holt 45 was produced for the US military, designated the Holt 45 E-HVS (Model T-12) it had armoured plate protecting the vehicle (but not the crew), 42 were delivered to the US military in 1917–1918. Small numbers of Holt 45s were also purchased by the French government for use as artillery tractors. Early in the war the French arms manufacturer Schneider-Creusot purchased several Holt 45s with the intention of fitting armour and creating a light tank, but their use for this purpose was opposed by Jules-Louis Breton, France's Undersecretary of State for Inventions for National Defense, and not pursued. The French Schneider CA1 tank used many components derived from the Holt 45, effectively being an armed and armoured superstructure on a modified Holt 45 chassis.

The Holt 45 weighed 7 short tons (6.3 long tons; 6.4 t) and dispensed with the tiller wheel of earlier Holt designs for steering. It was powered by a Holt M-9 4-cylinder petrol engine which had a bore and stroke of 6 and 7 in (150 and 180 mm), producing 45 hp (34 kW) at 600 rpm. The Holt 45 had a two speed transmission, maximum speed was 2.18 mph (3.51 km/h) in first gear and 2.92 mph (4.7 km/h) in second gear.

When production of the Holt 45 ceased in 1920, 1,891 had been produced.

== 5-ton Artillery Tractor Model 1917 ==
5-ton Artillery Tractor
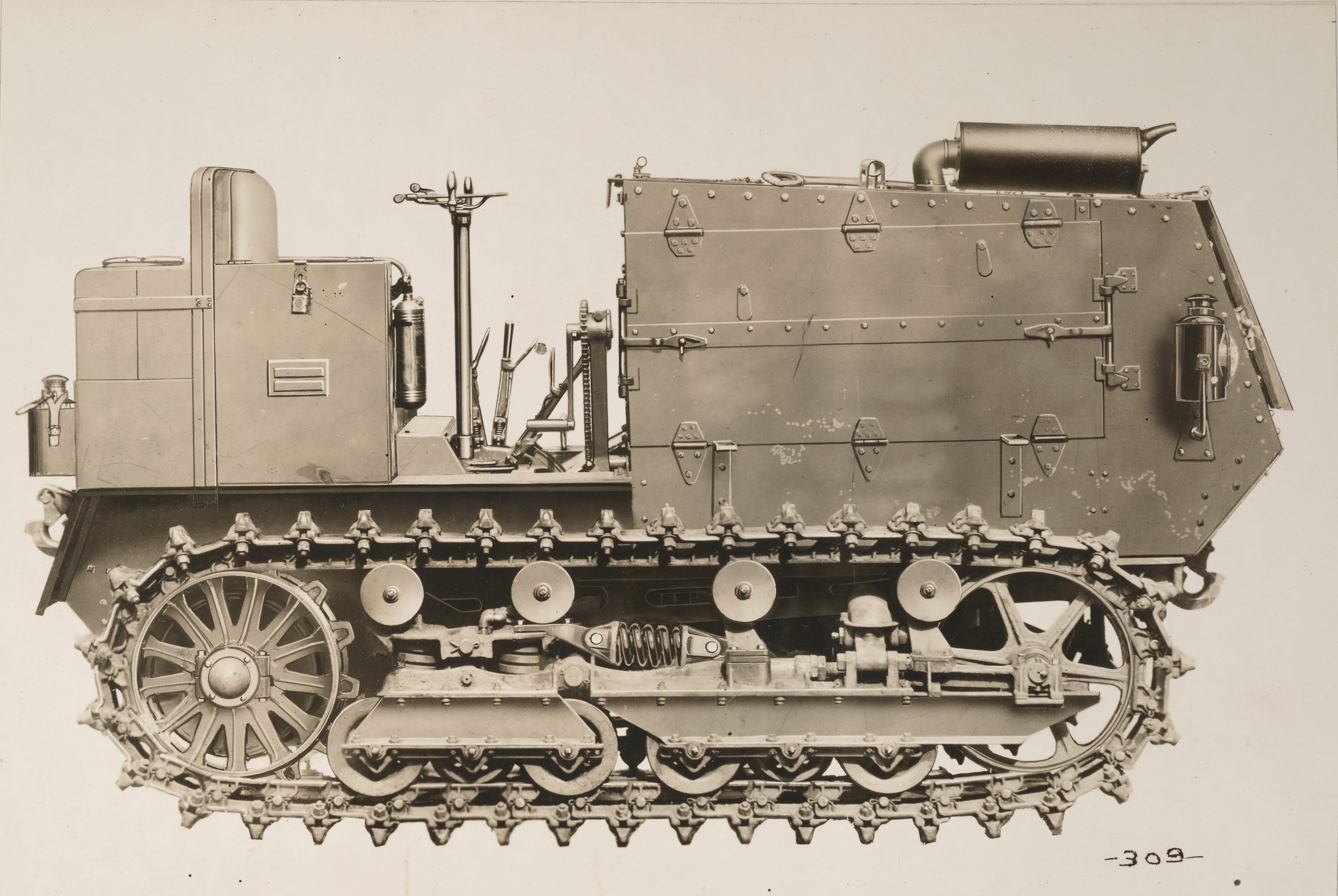
- Production: From July 1918
- Length: 11 ft 1 1/2 in (3.39 m)
- Weight: 4.6 short tons (4.1 long tons; 4.2 t)
- Engine model: Holt M-12 4-cylinder petrol 56 hp (42 kW) at 1,200 rpm
- Transmission: 3 forward, 1 reverse
- Speed: 7.37 mph (11.86 km/h)

The 5-ton Artillery Tractor Model 1917 (Model T-11) was used by the United States at the very end of the war and into the post-war years.

Production of the 5-ton Artillery Tractor began in July 1918, 11,150 were ordered and 3,480 had been delivered by 31 Jan 1919, 459 were delivered to France before the Armistice. With the exception of three produced by Holt, all wartime 5-ton Artillery Tractor production was undertaken under license by the Maxwell Motor Company and the REO Motor Car Company. In service the 5-ton Artillery Tractor was used to tow medium artillery such as the 155 mm Schneider howitzer.

The 5-ton Artillery Tractor was a rigid suspension armoured tractor, with armoured plate providing protection to the vehicle from bullets and shrapnel, but not the crew. The tractor was 11 ft 1 1/2 in (3.39 m) in length and weighed 4.6 short tons (4.1 long tons; 4.2 t). The 5-ton Artillery Tractor was powered by a Holt M-12 4-cylinder petrol engine which had a bore and stroke of 4 3/4 and 6 in (120 and 150 mm) that developed 56 hp (42 kW) at 1200 rpm. The 5-ton Artillery Tractor was driven through a three speed transmission which gave maximum speeds of 1.94 mph (3.1 km/h) in first gear, 3.92 mph (6.3 km/h) in second gear and 7.37 mph (11.9 km/h) in third gear.

Post-war, an unarmoured civilian version of the 5-ton Artillery Tractor was produced.

== 10-ton Artillery Tractor Model 1917 ==
10-ton Artillery Tractor
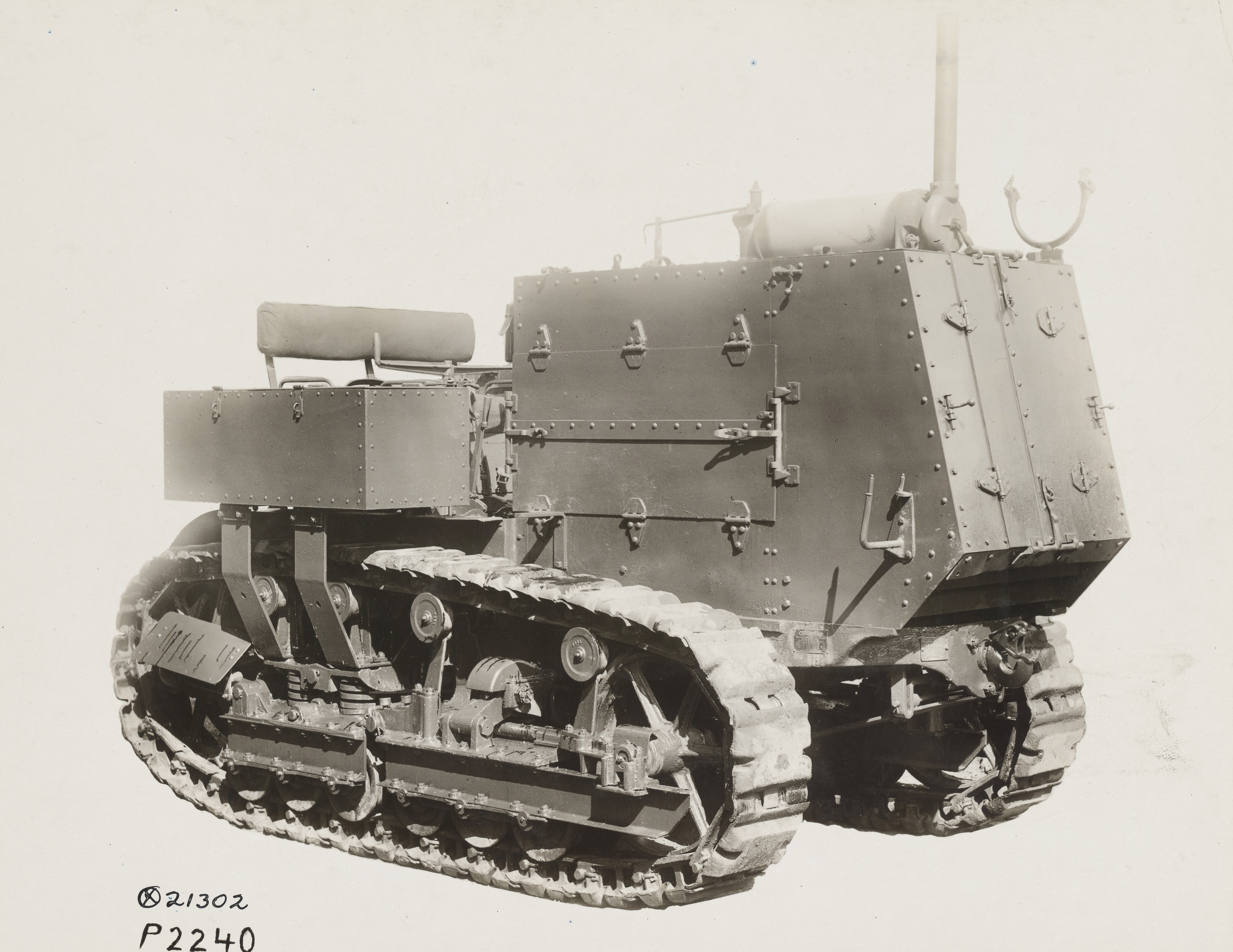
- Production: From 1918
- Length: 13 ft 6 in (4.11 m)
- Weight: 10 3/4 short tons (9.6 long tons; 9.8 t)
- Engine model: Holt M-11 4-cylinder petrol 75 hp (56 kW) at 1,000 rpm
- Transmission: 3 forward, 1 reverse
- Speed: 4.89 mph (7.9 km/h) at 800 rpm

The 10-ton Artillery Tractor Model 1917 (Model T-16) was used by the United States at the very end of the war and into the post-war years.

Production of the 10-ton Artillery Tractor began in 1918, 6,623 were ordered and 1,421 had been delivered by 31 Jan 1919, 628 were delivered to France before the Armistice. To meet demand, in addition to Holt license production was undertaken by the Chandler Motor Car Company. In service the 10-ton Artillery Tractor was used to tow heavy artillery pieces such as the 8-inch howitzer.

The 10-ton Artillery Tractor was a articulated rigid suspension armoured tractor, with armoured plate providing protection to the vehicle from bullets and shrapnel, but not the crew. The tractor was 13 ft 6 in (4.11 m) in length and weighed 10 3/4 short tons (9.6 long tons; 9.8 t). The 10-ton Artillery Tractor was powered by a Holt M-11 4-cylinder petrol engine which had a bore and stroke of 6 1/2 and 7 in (170 and 180 mm) that developed 75 hp (56 kW) at 1,000 rpm. The 10-ton Artillery Tractor was driven through a three speed transmission which, at 800 rpm, gave speeds of 1.96 mph (3.2 km/h) in first gear, 3.61 mph (5.8 km/h) in second gear and 4.89 mph (7.9 km/h) in third gear.

Post-war, an unarmoured civilian version of the 10-ton Artillery Tractor was produced.

== 2½-ton Artillery Tractor Model 1918 ==
2½-ton Artillery Tractor
- Production: 1918 (87 built)
- Length: 10 ft (3.05 m)
- Weight: 3.85 short tons (3.44 long tons; 3.49 t)
- Engine model: Cadillac V8 petrol 70 hp (52 kW)
- Transmission: 3 forward, 1 reverse
- Speed: 12 mph (19.31 km/h)

The 2½-ton Artillery Tractor Model 1918 was a light tractor trialled by the United States at the very end of the war.

Production of the 2½-ton Artillery Tractor began in 1918 and only 87 were built, it was considered an experimental vehicle designed with the hope to replace horses in field artillery units. It was found to be unreliable, too heavy for its intended role, not slow enough in first gear and incapable of fording water crossings horses could negotiate.

The 2½-ton Artillery Tractor was a rigid suspension armoured tractor, with armoured plate providing protection to the vehicle from bullets and shrapnel, but not the crew. The tractor was 10 ft (3.05 m) in length and weighed 3.85 short tons (3.44 long tons; 3.49 t). The 2½-ton Artillery Tractor was powered by a Cadillac V8 petrol engine which developed 70 hp (52 kW). The 2½-ton Artillery Tractor was driven through a three speed transmission which gave maximum speeds of 12 mph (19.3 km/h).
