= Over the Top (1917 song) =

"Over the Top (song)"
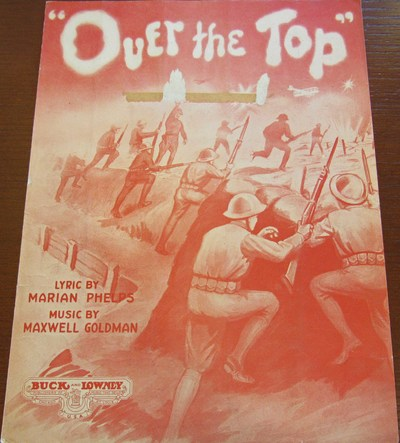
- Sheet Music cover

Song
- Language: English
- Published: 1917
- Composer(s): Maxwell Goldman
- Lyricist(s): Marion Phelps

Over the Top is a World War I song written by Marion Phelps and composed by Maxwell Goldman. The song was first published in 1917 by Buck & Lowney in New York, NY. The sheet music features soldiers crawling from a trench and attacking.

The sheet music can be found at the Pritzker Military Museum & Library.
