= Souain-Perthes-lès-Hurlus =

- Commune
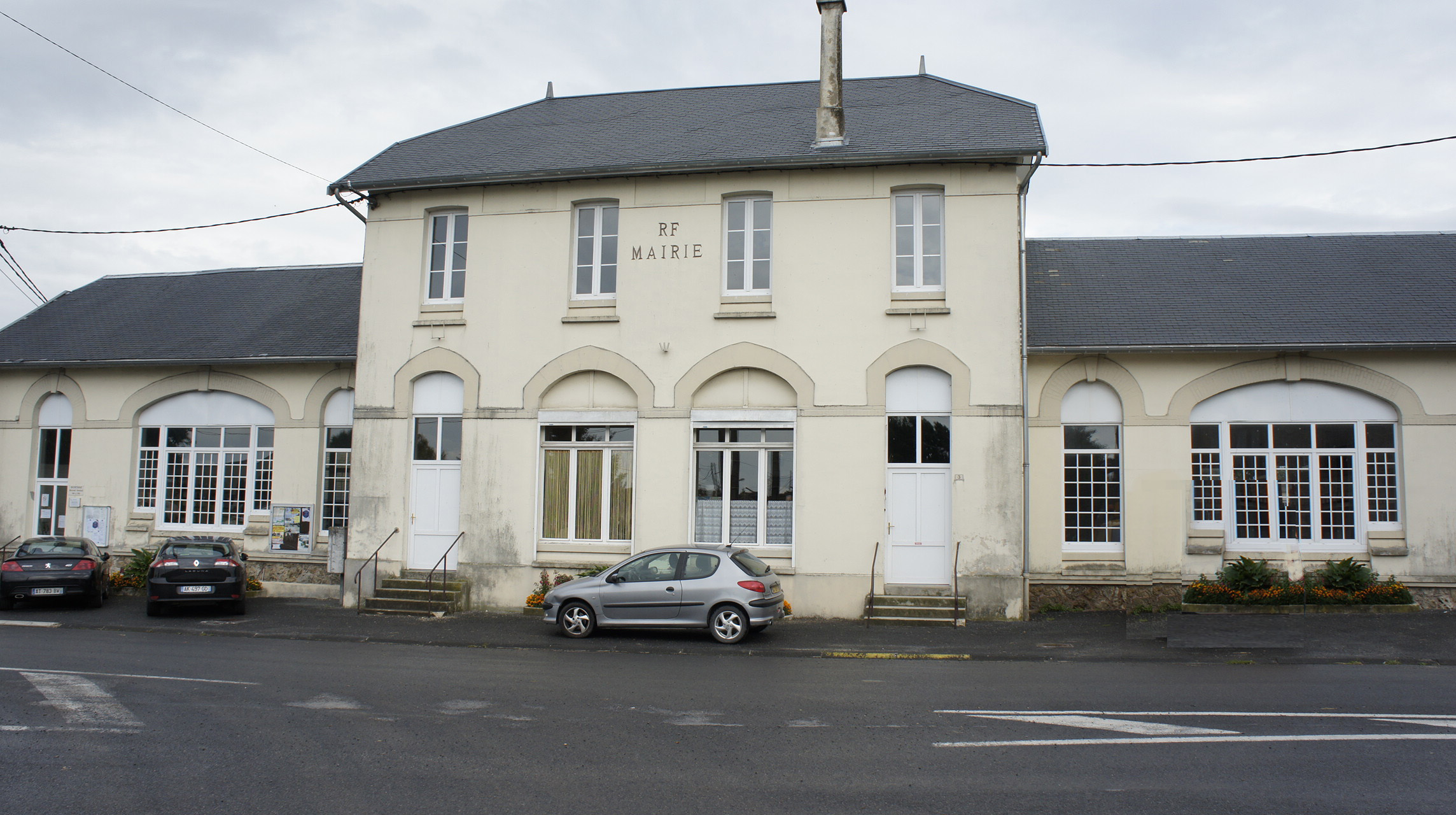
- The town hall in Souain
- Location of Souain-Perthes-lès-Hurlus
- Location within France Location within Grand Est
- Coordinates: 49°11′04″N 4°32′39″E
- Country: France
- Region: Grand Est
- Department: Marne
- Arrondissement: Châlons-en-Champagne
- Canton: Argonne Suippe et Vesle
- Intercommunality: Région de Suippes

Government
  - Mayor (2020–2026): Jean-Marie de Grammont
- Area^{1}: 53.12 km^{2} (20.51 sq mi)
- Elevation: 137 m (449 ft)
- Population (2023): 263
  - Density: 4.95/km^{2} (12.8/sq mi)
- Time zone: UTC+01:00 (CET)
  - Summer (DST): UTC+02:00 (CEST)
- INSEE/Postal code: 51553 /51600
- ^{1} French Land Register data, which excludes lakes, ponds, glaciers > 1 km^{2} (0.386 sq mi or 247 acres) and river estuaries.

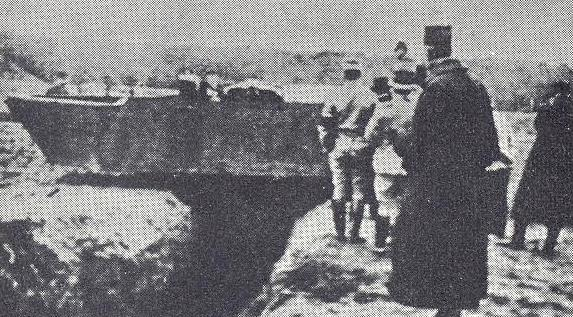
French armoured Baby Holt experiment at Souain, 9 December 1915.

Souain-Perthes-lès-Hurlus [swɛ̃.pɛʁt.lɛz‿yʁ.ly] is a commune in the Marne department in north-eastern France.

== First World War ==
On 9 December 1915 at Souain, a former battlefield with rough terrain and trenches, and in the presence of General Philippe Pétain, a prototype armoured vehicle motorized with a Baby Holt caterpillar was successfully tested. It is also known for the Souain corporals affair, 17 March 1915.

The village is the site of the Monument de la Légion Etrangère, an ossuary with 130 bodies of légionnaires from the 1st and 2nd Régiment Etrangers, who fell at the French offensive in Champagne, in September 1915. The monument ossuaire was erected in 1920 by William Farnsworth, father of Harvard alumnus Henry Farnsworth, a young American university student who had enlisted in the French Foreign Legion on 5 January 1915 and was killed 28 September 1915. The war had devastated the region, making construction very difficult. Nevertheless, the work was completed in less than six months, beginning in May and ending in November 1920, with work taking place seven days a week. Rue Henry Farnsworth in the town was also named for the fallen Farnsworth.

== See also ==
- Communes of the Marne department
