= Togny-aux-Bœufs =

- Commune
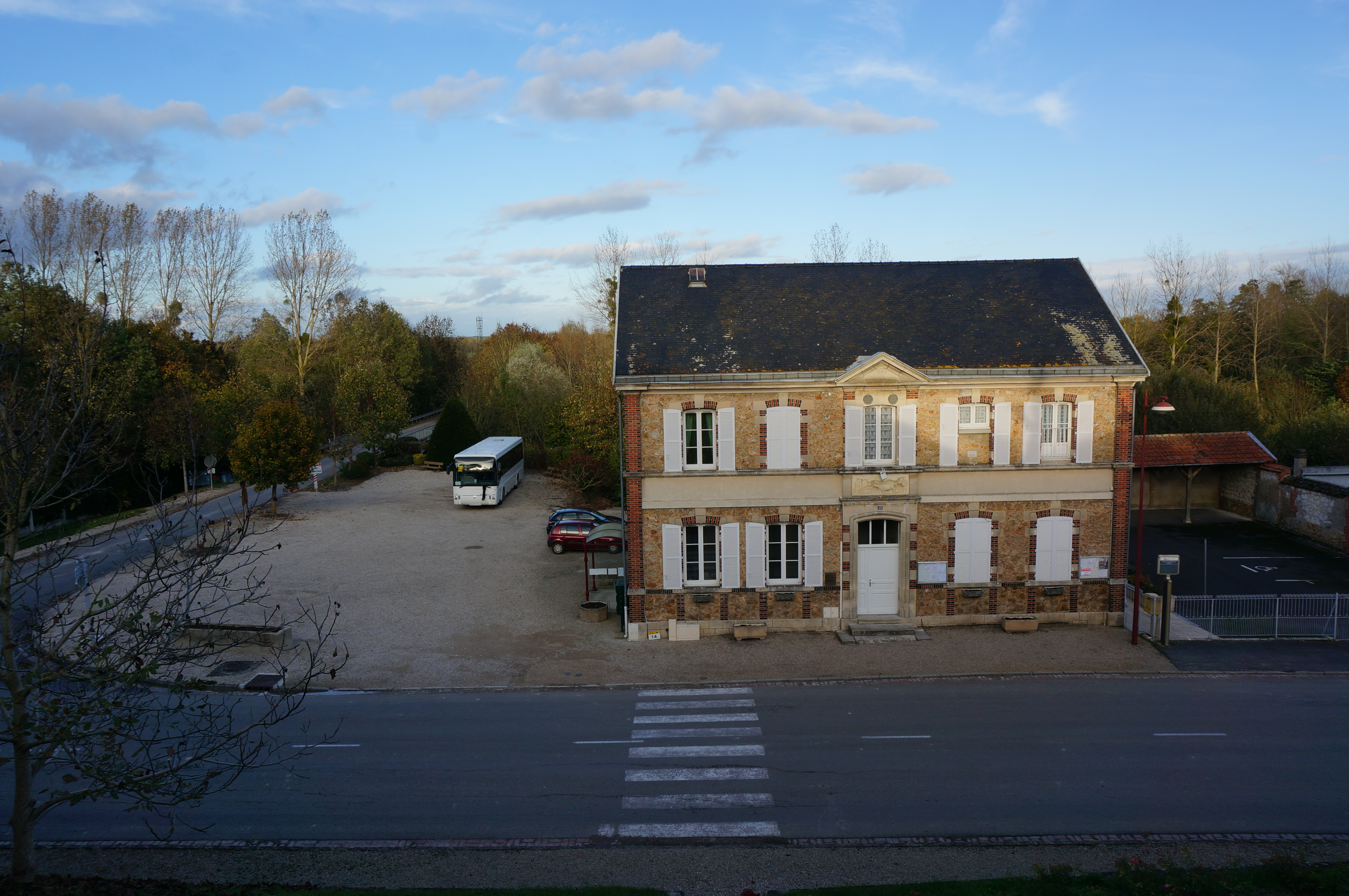
- The town hall in Togny-aux-Bœufs
- Location of Togny-aux-Bœufs
- Location within France Location within Grand Est
- Coordinates: 48°51′12″N 4°26′44″E
- Country: France
- Region: Grand Est
- Department: Marne
- Arrondissement: Châlons-en-Champagne
- Canton: Châlons-en-Champagne-3
- Intercommunality: CC de la Moivre à la Coole

Government
  - Mayor (2020–2026): Michel Jacquet
- Area^{1}: 9.98 km^{2} (3.85 sq mi)
- Elevation: 88 m (289 ft)
- Population (2023): 138
  - Density: 13.8/km^{2} (35.8/sq mi)
- Time zone: UTC+01:00 (CET)
  - Summer (DST): UTC+02:00 (CEST)
- INSEE/Postal code: 51574 /51240
- ^{1} French Land Register data, which excludes lakes, ponds, glaciers > 1 km^{2} (0.386 sq mi or 247 acres) and river estuaries.

Togny-aux-Bœufs (French pronunciation: [tɔɲi o bœf]) is a commune in the Marne department in Grand Est, in the north-east of France.

== Geography ==
The main river feeding the village is the Guenelle. The commune's territory extends from the southwest of the Champagne, north-east to the valley of Marne.

== Communes bordering Togny-aux-Bœufs ==
- Mairy-sur-Marne
- Vésigneul-sur-Marne
- Pogny
- Coupetz
- Vitry-la-Ville

== History ==
Togny-aux-Bœufs was founded by a Roman general named Toniacus. His name has evolved over time to Togny-sur-Guenelle, named after the river running along the village, only to take his name as currently known a priori that the cattle used in the construction of the basilica of 'Thorn would have come in pastures of the village to take some rest. The chalk used for construction could come also part of the village.

In 1375, a captain of the King of France, Enguerrand of Coucy, crosses the Champagne road with his band, to the great detriment of the plain "Thus the people of Togny-en-Champagne they saw themselves reduced to crowd into hiding to escape the terrible weapons people. "

== Policy and Administration ==
=== Cantonal attachment ===
During the Revolution, the town joined the canton of Pogny. This was abolished in 1801 and Togny-aux-Bœufs became part of the canton of Écury-sur-Coole. Under the cantonal redistribution in France in 2014, the town became part of the canton of Châlons-en-Champagne-3.

=== Intercommunality ===
The town, previously a member of the Community of communes of Guenelle, is a member, since 1 January 2014, of the communauté de communes de la Moivre à la Coole.

=== List of mayors ===
Term		Name
1848	1851	Alexis Gatelet
1851	1862	Joseph Songy
1862	1896	Onesimus Henry
1896	1908	Louis Estienne
1908	1913	Ulysses Gatelet
1913	1925	Henri Berthemy
1925	1935	Louis Ollivier
1935	1944	Louis Mortas
1944	1971	Robert Berton
1971	1983	Marc Jeanmaire
1983	2001	Michael Berton
2001	current	Michel Jacquet

== Demographics ==
Historical population

Year	Pop.	±% p.a.
1793	275	—
1821	300	+0.31%
1846	343	+0.54%
1872	323	−0.23%
1901	219	−1.33%
1926	192	−0.52%
1946	204	+0.30%
1962	200	−0.12%
1968	163	−3.35%

Year	Pop.	±% p.a.
1975	153	−0.90%
1982	165	+1.08%
1990	166	+0.08%
1999	161	−0.34%
2007	146	−1.22%
2012	128	−2.60%
2017	137	+1.37%
2023	138	+0.12%

Source: EHESS and INSEE

== Sites and Monuments ==
- The Church of St. Brice houses four articles classified historical monuments: a Madonna and Child of the 13th century, christ on the cross of the 14th century, a bas-relief of the Adoration of the Magi from the 15th century and a stained glass window depicting the Annunciation and two men kneeling alongside a bishop, dating from the 16th century.
- Robinson Chalons, relaxing place;
- by plane, archaeological sites can be identified;
- the town hall;
- the village cemetery contains many historical elements of interest.

== Personalities linked to the commune ==
- Togny-aux-Boeufs is the village of origin (from the 17th century) of the Chanoine family: Jean Louis Chanoine (1787-1872), general counsel of the Marne and mayor of Epernay 1840–48; Général Jules Chanoine (1835-1915), general counsel of the Marne and Minister of War in 1898; and champagne house Chanoine Frères

== See also ==
- Communes of the Marne department
