= Cernon =

Cernon may refer to:

- Cernon, Jura, a commune in the French region of Franche-Comté
- Cernon, Marne, a commune in the French region of Champagne-Ardenne
- Cernon (river), a contributor of the Garonne river, in the southern France
- Lapanouse-de-Cernon, a commune in the French region of Midi-Pyrénées
- Sainte-Eulalie-de-Cernon, a commune in the French region of Midi-Pyrénées
- Saint-Rome-de-Cernon, a commune in the French region of Midi-Pyrénées
