= Omey =

Omey may refer to the following:

== France ==
- Omey (commune), a commune in north-eastern France.

== Ireland ==
- Omey (civil parish), a civil parish in County Galway.
- Omey Island, an island in County Galway

== Surname ==
- Tom Omey, retired Belgian athlete
