= Nuisement =

Nuisement may refer to:

- Nuisement-sur-Coole, a commune in the Marne department in north-eastern France
- Puits-et-Nuisement, a commune in the Aube department in north-central France
- Sainte-Marie-du-Lac-Nuisement, a commune in the Marne department in north-eastern France
