= Moivre =

Moivre may refer to:

- Abraham de Moivre
- de Moivre's formula
- 28729 Moivre
- Moivre, Marne
