= Arrondissement of Châlons-en-Champagne =

Coordinates: 48°57′N 4°21′E

Châlons-en-Champagne
- Arrondissement
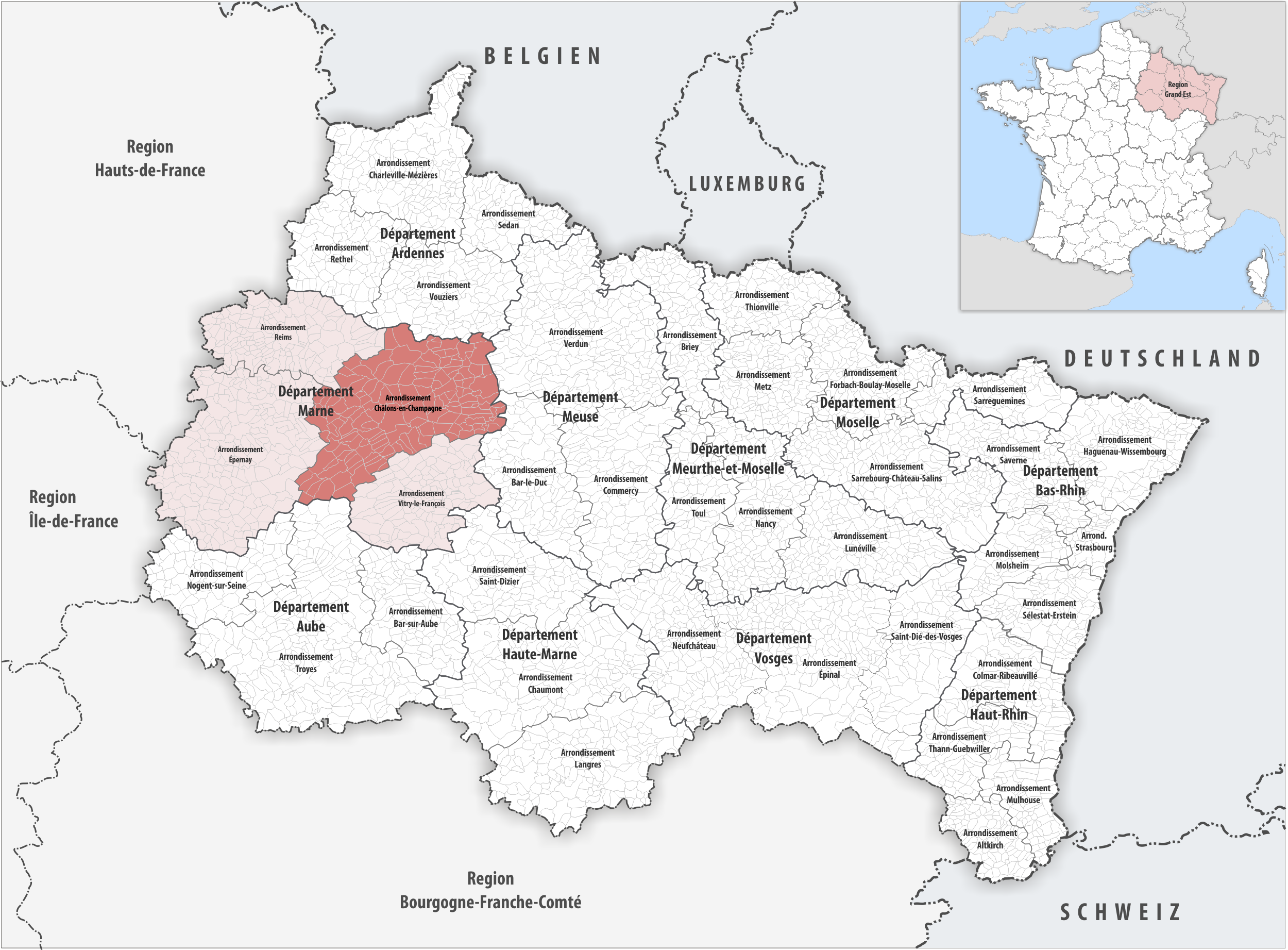
- Location within the region Grand Est
- Country: France
- Region: Grand Est
- Department: Marne
- No. of communes: {{{nbcomm}}}
- Area: 2,612.4 km^{2} (1,008.7 sq mi)
- Population (2023): 106,611
  - Density: 40.810/km^{2} (105.70/sq mi)
- INSEE code: 511

The arrondissement of Châlons-en-Champagne is an arrondissement of France in the Marne department in the Grand Est region. It has 149 communes. Its population is 107,923 (2021), and its area is 2,612.4 km^{2} (1,008.7 sq mi).

== Composition ==
The communes of the arrondissement of Châlons-en-Champagne, and their INSEE codes, are:

1. Aigny (51003)
2. Argers (51015)
3. Aulnay-sur-Marne (51023)
4. Auve (51027)
5. Baconnes (51031)
6. Belval-en-Argonne (51047)
7. Berzieux (51053)
8. Binarville (51062)
9. Bouy (51078)
10. Braux-Sainte-Cohière (51082)
11. Braux-Saint-Remy (51083)
12. Breuvery-sur-Coole (51087)
13. Bussy-le-Château (51097)
14. Bussy-Lettrée (51099)
15. Cernay-en-Dormois (51104)
16. Cernon (51106)
17. Châlons-en-Champagne (51108)
18. Champigneul-Champagne (51117)
19. La Chapelle-Felcourt (51126)
20. Les Charmontois (51132)
21. Le Châtelier (51133)
22. Châtrices (51138)
23. Chaudefontaine (51139)
24. Le Chemin (51143)
25. Cheniers (51146)
26. La Cheppe (51147)
27. Cheppes-la-Prairie (51148)
28. Chepy (51149)
29. Cherville (51150)
30. Compertrix (51160)
31. Condé-sur-Marne (51161)
32. Contault (51166)
33. Coolus (51168)
34. Coupetz (51178)
35. Coupéville (51179)
36. Courtémont (51191)
37. Courtisols (51193)
38. La Croix-en-Champagne (51197)
39. Cuperly (51203)
40. Dampierre-le-Château (51206)
41. Dampierre-sur-Moivre (51208)
42. Dommartin-Dampierre (51211)
43. Dommartin-Lettrée (51212)
44. Dommartin-sous-Hans (51213)
45. Dommartin-Varimont (51214)
46. Éclaires (51222)
47. Écury-sur-Coole (51227)
48. Élise-Daucourt (51228)
49. Épense (51229)
50. L'Épine (51231)
51. Fagnières (51242)
52. Faux-Vésigneul (51244)
53. Florent-en-Argonne (51253)
54. Fontaine-en-Dormois (51255)
55. Francheville (51259)
56. Le Fresne (51260)
57. Givry-en-Argonne (51272)
58. Gizaucourt (51274)
59. Les Grandes-Loges (51278)
60. Gratreuil (51280)
61. Hans (51283)
62. Haussimont (51285)
63. Herpont (51292)
64. Isse (51301)
65. Jâlons (51303)
66. Jonchery-sur-Suippe (51307)
67. Juvigny (51312)
68. Laval-sur-Tourbe (51317)
69. Lenharrée (51319)
70. Livry-Louvercy (51326)
71. Maffrécourt (51336)
72. Mairy-sur-Marne (51339)
73. Malmy (51341)
74. Marson (51354)
75. Massiges (51355)
76. Matougues (51357)
77. Minaucourt-le-Mesnil-lès-Hurlus (51368)
78. Moiremont (51370)
79. Moivre (51371)
80. Moncetz-Longevas (51372)
81. Montépreux (51377)
82. Mourmelon-le-Grand (51388)
83. Mourmelon-le-Petit (51389)
84. La Neuville-au-Pont (51399)
85. La Neuville-au-Temple (51485)
86. La Neuville-aux-Bois (51397)
87. Noirlieu (51404)
88. Nuisement-sur-Coole (51409)
89. Omey (51415)
90. Passavant-en-Argonne (51424)
91. Pogny (51436)
92. Poix (51438)
93. Rapsécourt (51452)
94. Recy (51453)
95. Remicourt (51456)
96. Rouvroy-Ripont (51470)
97. Sainte-Marie-à-Py (51501)
98. Sainte-Menehould (51507)
99. Saint-Étienne-au-Temple (51476)
100. Saint-Germain-la-Ville (51482)
101. Saint-Gibrien (51483)
102. Saint-Hilaire-le-Grand (51486)
103. Saint-Jean-sur-Moivre (51490)
104. Saint-Jean-sur-Tourbe (51491)
105. Saint-Mard-sur-Auve (51498)
106. Saint-Mard-sur-le-Mont (51500)
107. Saint-Martin-aux-Champs (51502)
108. Saint-Martin-sur-le-Pré (51504)
109. Saint-Memmie (51506)
110. Saint-Pierre (51509)
111. Saint-Quentin-sur-Coole (51512)
112. Saint-Remy-sur-Bussy (51515)
113. Saint-Thomas-en-Argonne (51519)
114. Sarry (51525)
115. Servon-Melzicourt (51533)
116. Sivry-Ante (51537)
117. Sogny-aux-Moulins (51538)
118. Somme-Bionne (51543)
119. Sommepy-Tahure (51544)
120. Sommesous (51545)
121. Somme-Suippe (51546)
122. Somme-Tourbe (51547)
123. Somme-Vesle (51548)
124. Somme-Yèvre (51549)
125. Souain-Perthes-lès-Hurlus (51553)
126. Soudé (51555)
127. Soudron (51556)
128. Suippes (51559)
129. Thibie (51566)
130. Tilloy-et-Bellay (51572)
131. Togny-aux-Bœufs (51574)
132. Vadenay (51587)
133. Valmy (51588)
134. Vassimont-et-Chapelaine (51594)
135. Vatry (51595)
136. Verrières (51610)
137. Vésigneul-sur-Marne (51616)
138. La Veuve (51617)
139. Le Vieil-Dampierre (51619)
140. Vienne-la-Ville (51620)
141. Vienne-le-Château (51621)
142. Villers-en-Argonne (51632)
143. Villers-le-Château (51634)
144. Ville-sur-Tourbe (51640)
145. Virginy (51646)
146. Vitry-la-Ville (51648)
147. Voilemont (51650)
148. Vraux (51656)
149. Wargemoulin-Hurlus (51659)

== History ==
The arrondissement of Châlons-en-Champagne was created in 1800. At the April 2017 reorganisation of the arrondissements of Marne, it gained the 67 communes from the former arrondissement of Sainte-Menehould, four communes from the arrondissement of Épernay, one commune from the arrondissement of Reims and three communes from the arrondissement of Vitry-le-François, and it lost 23 communes to the arrondissement of Épernay and two communes to the arrondissement of Reims.

As a result of the reorganisation of the cantons of France which came into effect in 2015, the borders of the cantons are no longer related to the borders of the arrondissements. The cantons of the arrondissement of Châlons-en-Champagne were, as of January 2015:

1. Châlons-en-Champagne-1
2. Châlons-en-Champagne-2
3. Châlons-en-Champagne-3
4. Châlons-en-Champagne-4
5. Écury-sur-Coole
6. Marson
7. Suippes
8. Vertus
