= Saint-Martin-aux-Champs =

- Commune
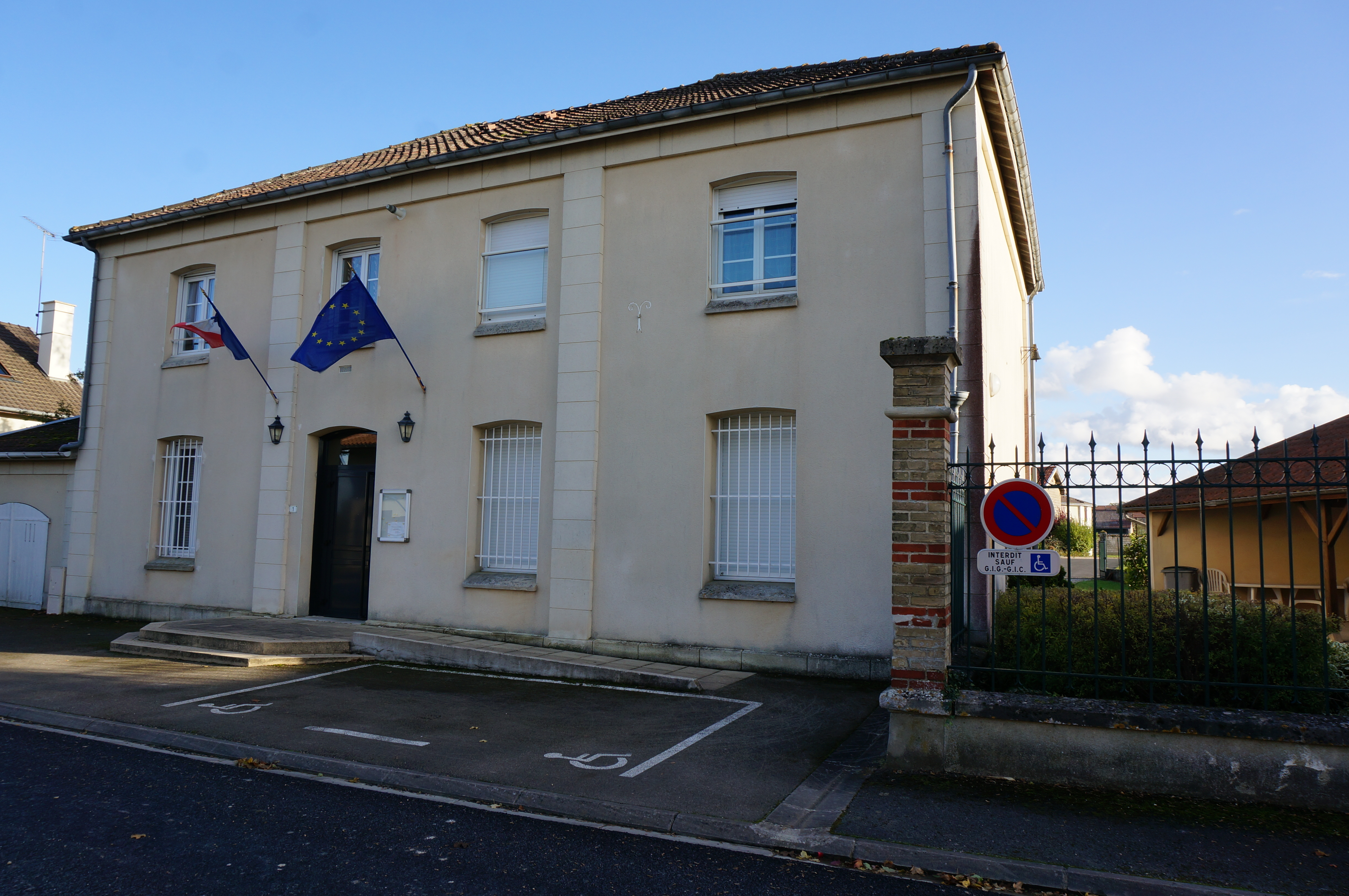
- The town hall in Saint-Martin-aux-Champs
- Location of Saint-Martin-aux-Champs
- Location within France Location within Grand Est
- Coordinates: 48°49′21″N 4°29′20″E
- Country: France
- Region: Grand Est
- Department: Marne
- Arrondissement: Châlons-en-Champagne
- Canton: Châlons-en-Champagne-3

Government
  - Mayor (2020–2026): Daniel Herbillon
- Area^{1}: 7.2 km^{2} (2.8 sq mi)
- Elevation: 92 m (302 ft)
- Population (2023): 101
  - Density: 14/km^{2} (36/sq mi)
- Time zone: UTC+01:00 (CET)
  - Summer (DST): UTC+02:00 (CEST)
- INSEE/Postal code: 51502 /51240
- ^{1} French Land Register data, which excludes lakes, ponds, glaciers > 1 km^{2} (0.386 sq mi or 247 acres) and river estuaries.

Saint-Martin-aux-Champs (French pronunciation: [sɛ̃ maʁtɛ̃ o ʃɑ̃]) is a commune in the Marne department in north-eastern France.

== See also ==
- Communes of the Marne department
