= Saint-Jean-sur-Moivre =

- Commune
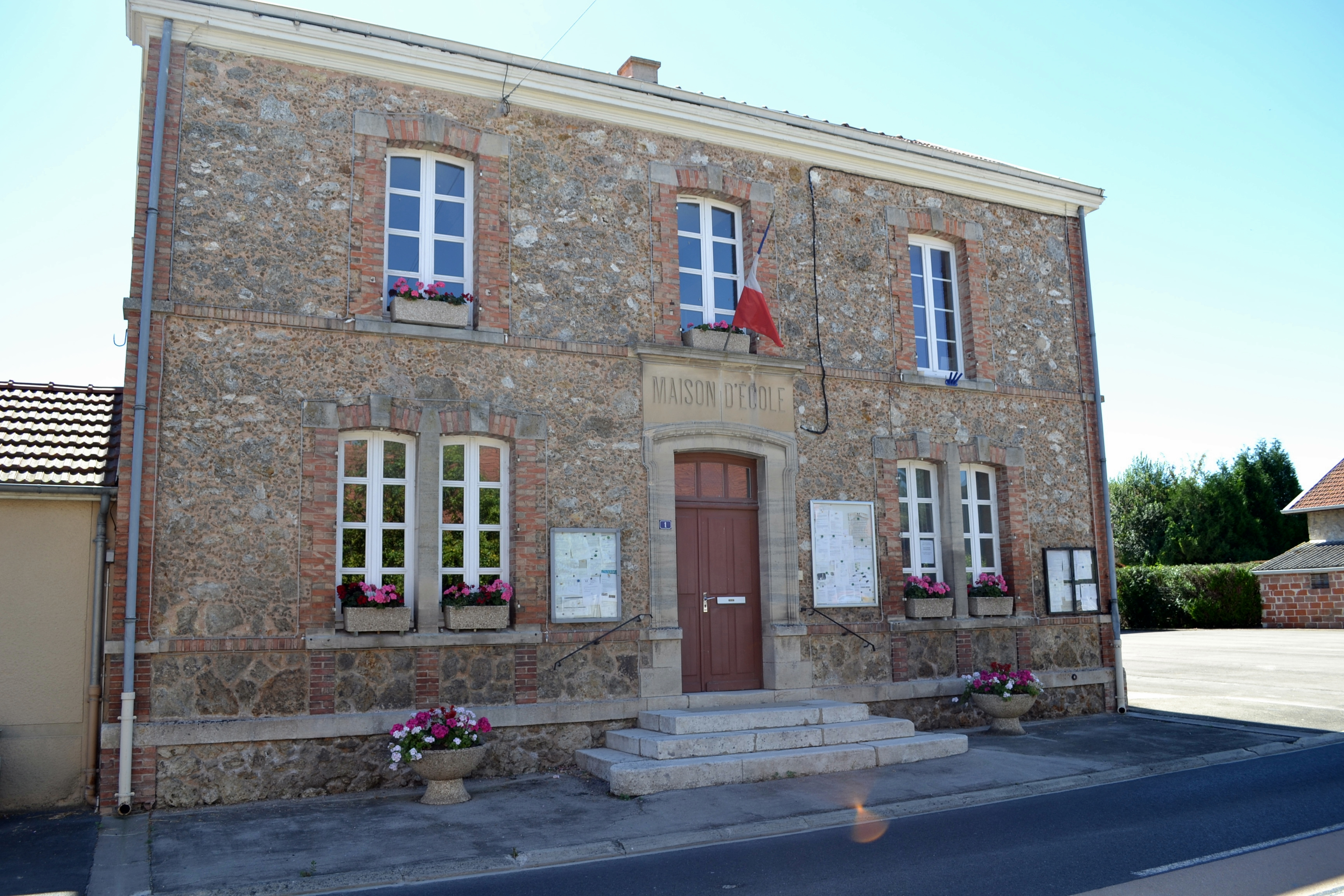
- The town hall in Saint-Jean-sur-Moivre
- Location of Saint-Jean-sur-Moivre
- Location within France Location within Grand Est
- Coordinates: 48°54′17″N 4°35′03″E
- Country: France
- Region: Grand Est
- Department: Marne
- Arrondissement: Châlons-en-Champagne
- Canton: Châlons-en-Champagne-3

Government
  - Mayor (2020–2026): Raymond Lapie
- Area^{1}: 15.07 km^{2} (5.82 sq mi)
- Elevation: 110 m (360 ft)
- Population (2023): 197
  - Density: 13.1/km^{2} (33.9/sq mi)
- Time zone: UTC+01:00 (CET)
  - Summer (DST): UTC+02:00 (CEST)
- INSEE/Postal code: 51490 /51240
- ^{1} French Land Register data, which excludes lakes, ponds, glaciers > 1 km^{2} (0.386 sq mi or 247 acres) and river estuaries.

Saint-Jean-sur-Moivre (French pronunciation: [sɛ̃ ʒɑ̃ syʁ mwavʁ]) is a commune in the Marne department in north-eastern France.

== See also ==
- Communes of the Marne department
