= Vassimont-et-Chapelaine =

- Commune
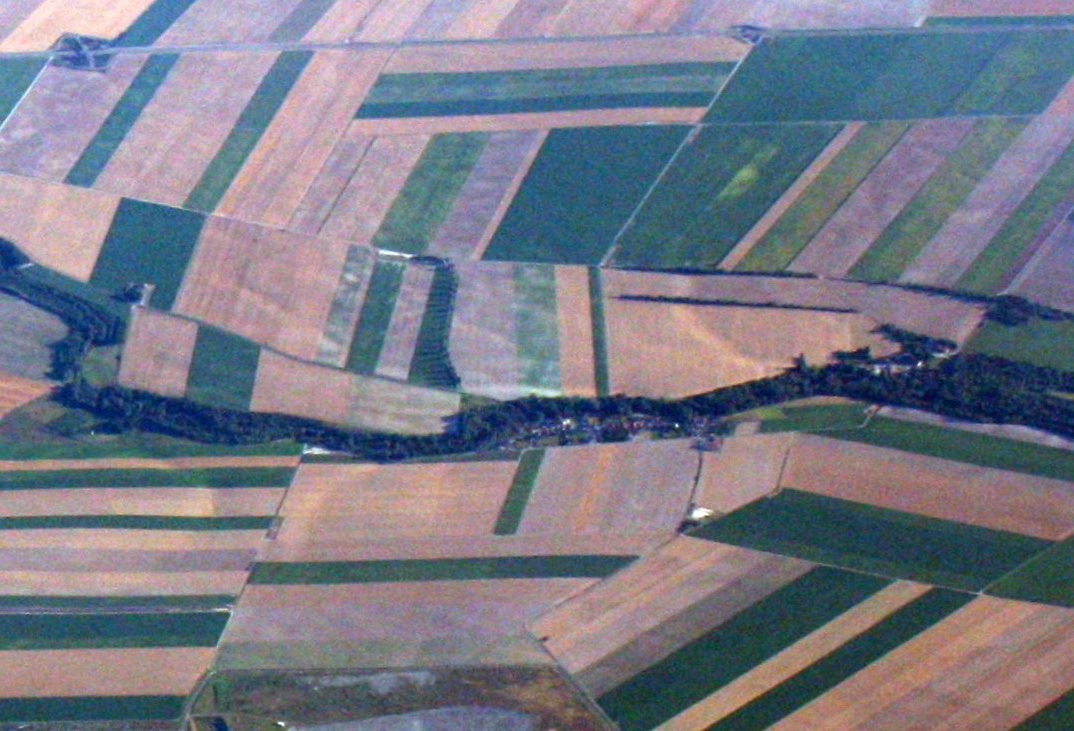
- An aerial view of Vassimont-et-Chapelaine

- Coat of arms
- Location of Vassimont-et-Chapelaine
- Location within France Location within Grand Est
- Coordinates: 48°45′54″N 4°08′43″E
- Country: France
- Region: Grand Est
- Department: Marne
- Arrondissement: Châlons-en-Champagne
- Canton: Châlons-en-Champagne-3
- Intercommunality: CA Châlons-en-Champagne

Government
  - Mayor (2020–2026): Emmanuel Aubert
- Area^{1}: 21.73 km^{2} (8.39 sq mi)
- Elevation: 159 m (522 ft)
- Population (2023): 62
  - Density: 2.9/km^{2} (7.4/sq mi)
- Time zone: UTC+01:00 (CET)
  - Summer (DST): UTC+02:00 (CEST)
- INSEE/Postal code: 51594 /51320
- ^{1} French Land Register data, which excludes lakes, ponds, glaciers > 1 km^{2} (0.386 sq mi or 247 acres) and river estuaries.

Vassimont-et-Chapelaine (French pronunciation: [vasimɔ̃ e ʃaplɛn]) is a commune in the Marne department in north-eastern France.

== See also ==
- Communes of the Marne department
