= Breuvery-sur-Coole =

- Commune
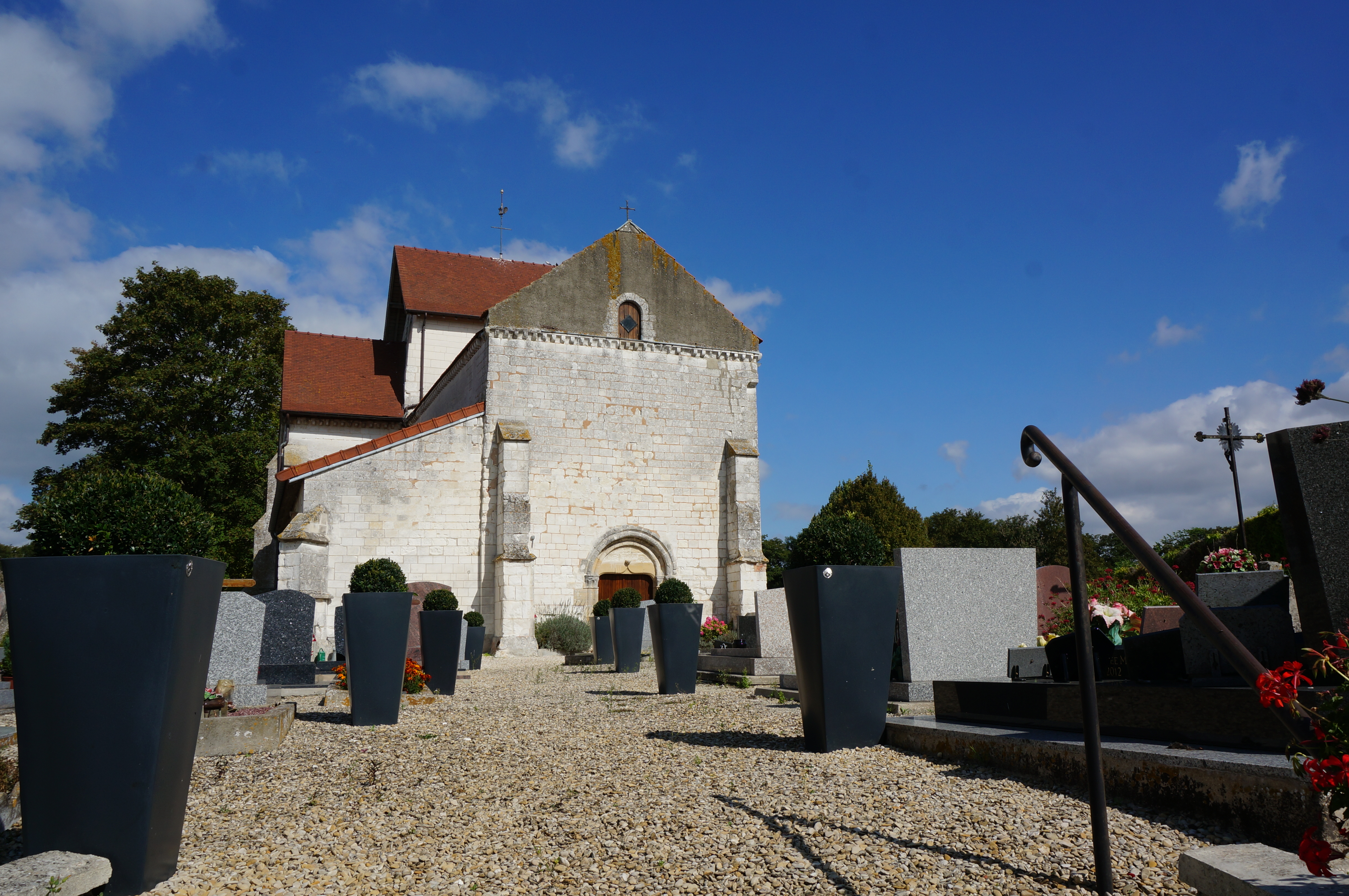
- The church in Breuvery-sur-Coole
- Location of Breuvery-sur-Coole
- Location within France Location within Grand Est
- Coordinates: 48°51′40″N 4°18′46″E
- Country: France
- Region: Grand Est
- Department: Marne
- Arrondissement: Châlons-en-Champagne
- Canton: Châlons-en-Champagne-3

Government
  - Mayor (2020–2026): Maurice Pierre
- Area^{1}: 10.06 km^{2} (3.88 sq mi)
- Elevation: 70 m (230 ft)
- Highest elevation: 144 m (472 ft)
- Lowest elevation: 92 m (302 ft)
- Population (2023): 207
  - Density: 20.6/km^{2} (53.3/sq mi)
- Time zone: UTC+01:00 (CET)
  - Summer (DST): UTC+02:00 (CEST)
- INSEE/Postal code: 51087 /51240
- ^{1} French Land Register data, which excludes lakes, ponds, glaciers > 1 km^{2} (0.386 sq mi or 247 acres) and river estuaries.

Breuvery-sur-Coole (French pronunciation: [bʁœvʁi syʁ kɔl]) is a commune in the Marne department in northeastern France.

== Population ==
Historical population
Year	Pop.	±% p.a.
1968	87	—
1975	76	−1.91%
1982	150	+10.20%
1990	188	+2.86%
1999	200	+0.69%
2007	205	+0.31%
2012	211	+0.58%
2017	217	+0.56%
2023	207	−0.78%
Source: INSEE

== See also ==
- Communes of the Marne department
