= Lenharrée =

- Commune
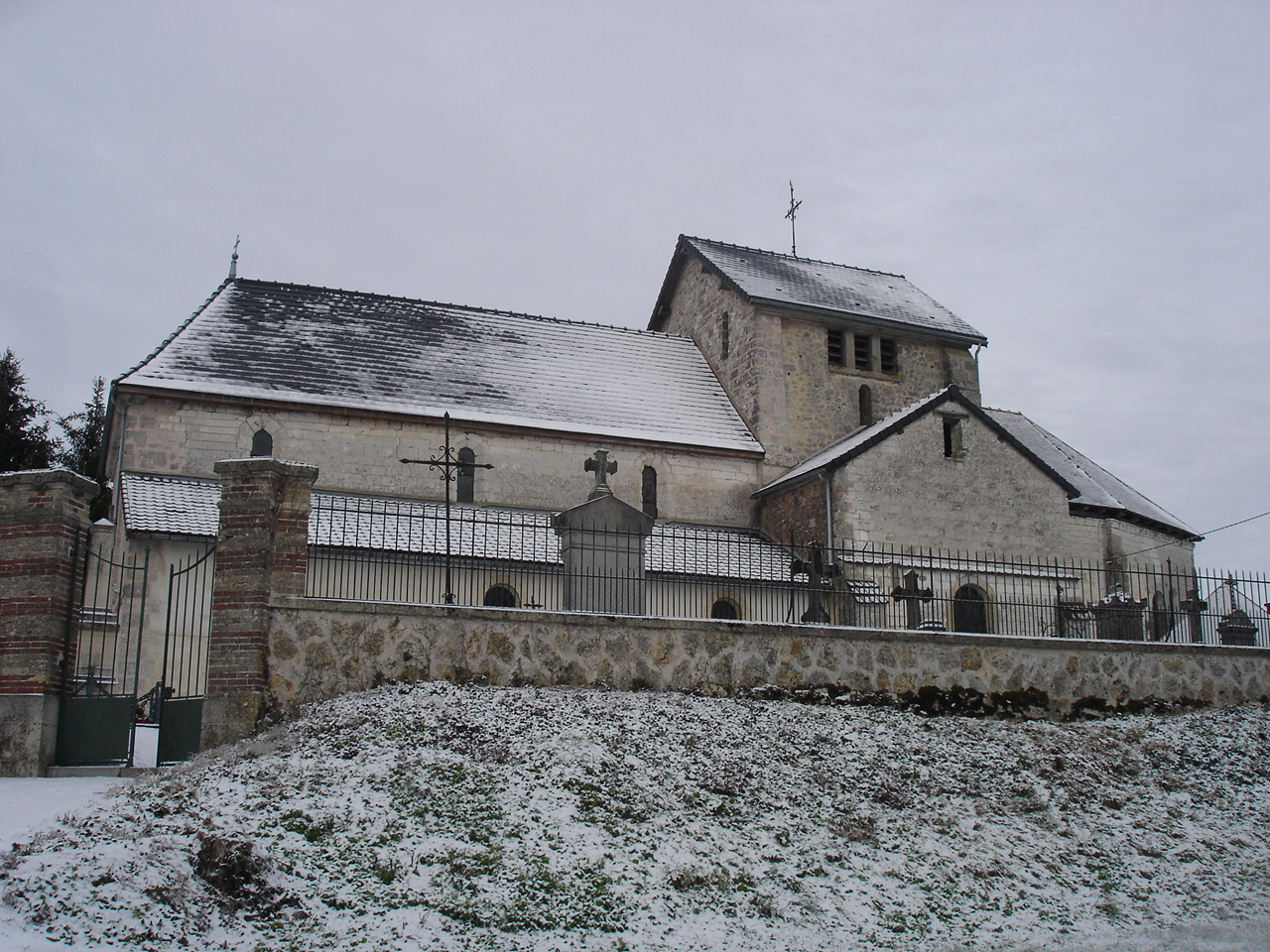
- The church in Lenharrée

- Coat of arms
- Location of Lenharrée
- Location within France Location within Grand Est
- Coordinates: 48°46′36″N 4°06′56″E
- Country: France
- Region: Grand Est
- Department: Marne
- Arrondissement: Châlons-en-Champagne
- Canton: Châlons-en-Champagne-3
- Intercommunality: CA Châlons-en-Champagne

Government
  - Mayor (2020–2026): Jean-Pierre Lacuisse
- Area^{1}: 17.75 km^{2} (6.85 sq mi)
- Elevation: 152 m (499 ft)
- Population (2023): 101
  - Density: 5.69/km^{2} (14.7/sq mi)
- Demonym: Lenhriots
- Time zone: UTC+01:00 (CET)
  - Summer (DST): UTC+02:00 (CEST)
- INSEE/Postal code: 51319 /51230
- ^{1} French Land Register data, which excludes lakes, ponds, glaciers > 1 km^{2} (0.386 sq mi or 247 acres) and river estuaries.

Lenharrée (French pronunciation: [lɑ̃ʁe]) is a commune in the Marne department in north-eastern France.

== See also ==
- Communes of the Marne department
