= Saint-Memmie =

- Commune
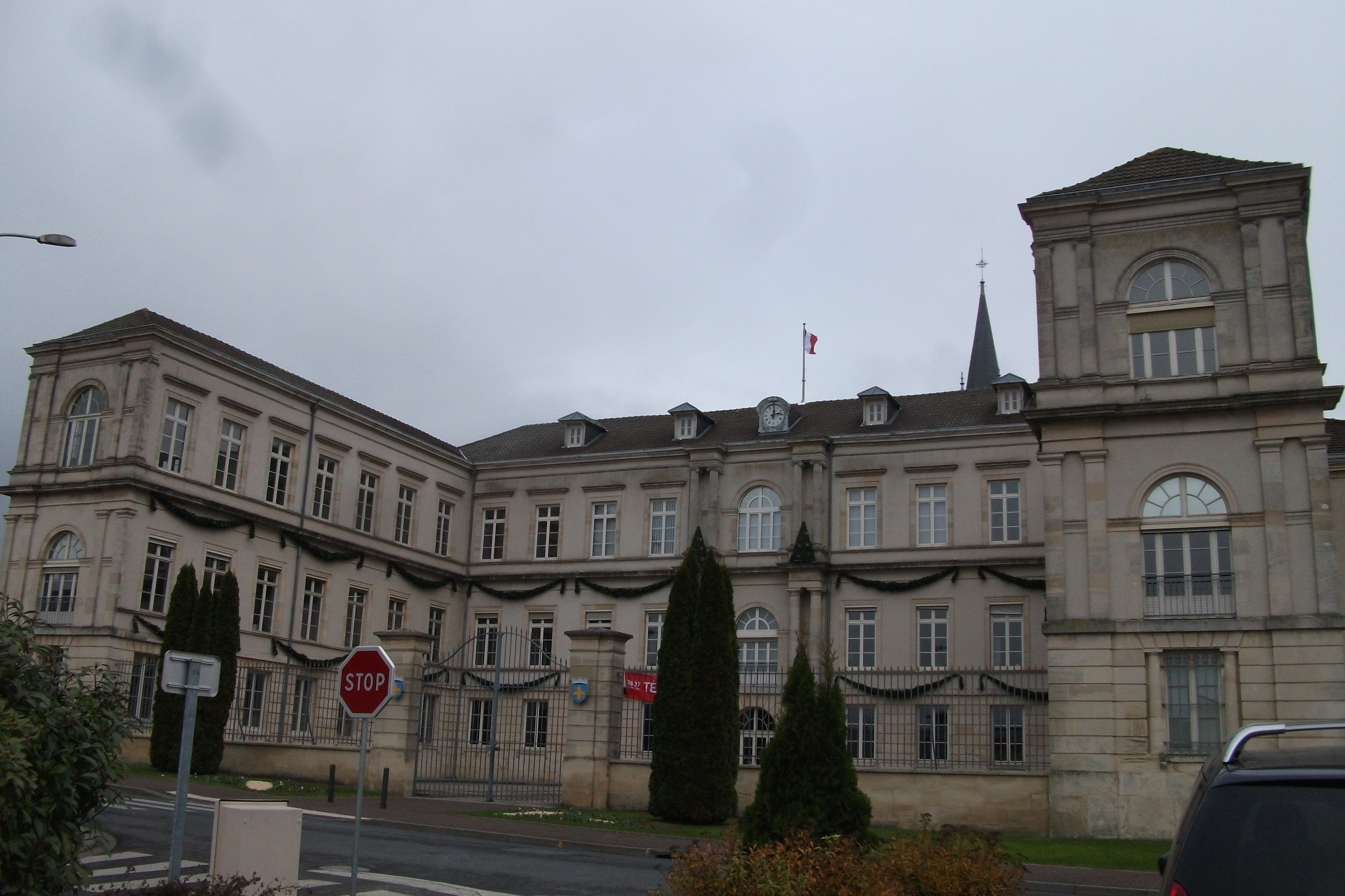
- The town hall in Saint-Memmie

- Coat of arms
- Location of Saint-Memmie
- Location within France Location within Grand Est
- Coordinates: 48°57′13″N 4°23′02″E
- Country: France
- Region: Grand Est
- Department: Marne
- Arrondissement: Châlons-en-Champagne
- Canton: Châlons-en-Champagne-3
- Intercommunality: CA Châlons-en-Champagne

Government
  - Mayor (2020–2026): Sylvie Butin
- Area^{1}: 12.64 km^{2} (4.88 sq mi)
- Elevation: 83 m (272 ft)
- Population (2023): 5,441
  - Density: 430.5/km^{2} (1,115/sq mi)
- Time zone: UTC+01:00 (CET)
  - Summer (DST): UTC+02:00 (CEST)
- INSEE/Postal code: 51506 /51470
- ^{1} French Land Register data, which excludes lakes, ponds, glaciers > 1 km^{2} (0.386 sq mi or 247 acres) and river estuaries.

Saint-Memmie (French pronunciation: [sɛ̃ mɛmi]) is a commune in the Marne department in north-eastern France.

== Population ==
Historical population
Year	Pop.	±% p.a.
1968	2,355	—
1975	6,591	+15.84%
1982	6,654	+0.14%
1990	6,070	−1.14%
1999	5,670	−0.75%
2007	5,356	−0.71%
2012	5,503	+0.54%
2017	5,511	+0.03%
2023	5,441	−0.21%
Source: INSEE

== See also ==
- Communes of the Marne department
