= Le Fresne, Marne =

Le Fresne
- Commune
- Location of Le Fresne
- Location within France Location within Grand Est
- Coordinates: 48°54′41″N 4°38′34″E
- Country: France
- Region: Grand Est
- Department: Marne
- Arrondissement: Châlons-en-Champagne
- Canton: Châlons-en-Champagne-3
- Intercommunality: CC de la Moivre à la Coole

Government
  - Mayor (2020–2026): Jean-Claude Arnould
- Area^{1}: 17.71 km^{2} (6.84 sq mi)
- Elevation: 124 m (407 ft)
- Population (2023): 74
  - Density: 4.2/km^{2} (11/sq mi)
- Time zone: UTC+01:00 (CET)
  - Summer (DST): UTC+02:00 (CEST)
- INSEE/Postal code: 51260 /51240
- ^{1} French Land Register data, which excludes lakes, ponds, glaciers > 1 km^{2} (0.386 sq mi or 247 acres) and river estuaries.

Le Fresne (French pronunciation: [lə fʁɛn]) is a commune in the Marne department in the Grand Est region in north-eastern France.

== See also ==
- Communes of the Marne department
