= Dommartin-Lettrée =

- Commune
- Location of Dommartin-Lettrée
- Location within France Location within Grand Est
- Coordinates: 48°46′02″N 4°17′58″E
- Country: France
- Region: Grand Est
- Department: Marne
- Arrondissement: Châlons-en-Champagne
- Canton: Châlons-en-Champagne-3
- Intercommunality: CA Châlons-en-Champagne

Government
  - Mayor (2020–2026): Damien Lhote
- Area^{1}: 32.67 km^{2} (12.61 sq mi)
- Elevation: 147 m (482 ft)
- Population (2023): 165
  - Density: 5.05/km^{2} (13.1/sq mi)
- Time zone: UTC+01:00 (CET)
  - Summer (DST): UTC+02:00 (CEST)
- INSEE/Postal code: 51212 /51320
- ^{1} French Land Register data, which excludes lakes, ponds, glaciers > 1 km^{2} (0.386 sq mi or 247 acres) and river estuaries.

Dommartin-Lettrée (French pronunciation: [dɔmaʁtɛ̃ lɛtʁe]) is a village and commune in the Marne department in north-eastern France some 22 kilometres south of Châlons-en-Champagne and some 22 kilometres west of Vitry-le-François. The church is to be found in a central position in the village and the Commonwealth war graves of five airmen of the Royal Air Force and two of the Royal Canadian Air Force lie in the churchyard immediately behind the church.

The seven serviceman were killed when their Lancaster bomber (Lancaster III serial JB741 code: AR-J) was shot down near the village by enemy fire on May 4, 1944, before completing their mission.

== Demography ==
Historical population
| Year | Pop. | ±% p.a. |
|---|---|---|
| 1968 | 216 | — |
| 1975 | 166 | −3.69% |
| 1982 | 179 | +1.08% |
| 1990 | 169 | −0.72% |
| 1999 | 153 | −1.10% |
| 2007 | 151 | −0.16% |
| 2012 | 152 | +0.13% |
| 2017 | 153 | +0.13% |
| 2023 | 165 | +1.27% |
Source: INSEE

== See also ==
- Communes of the Marne department
- Commonwealth War Graves Commission
