= Francheville, Marne =

Francheville
- Commune
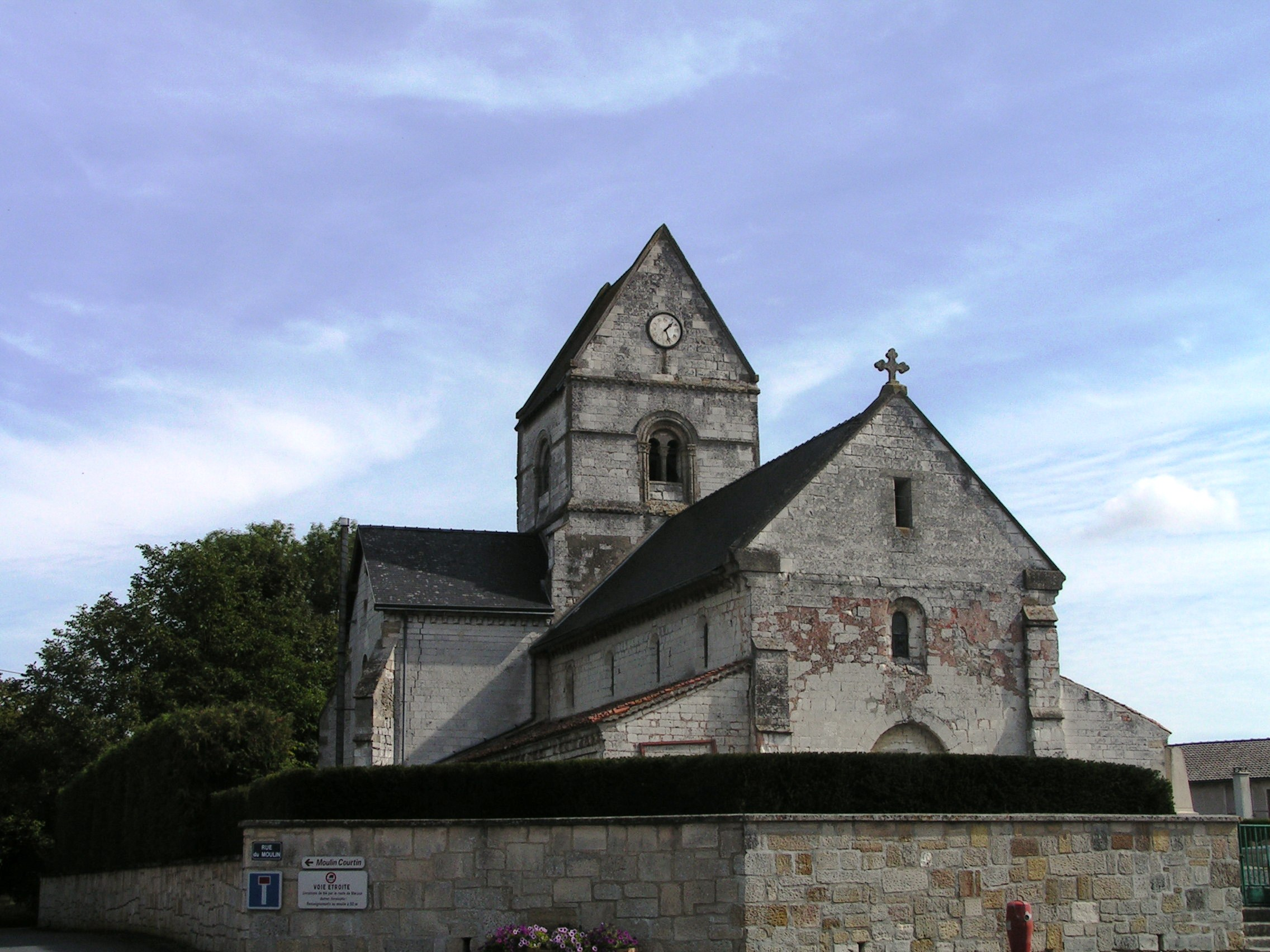
- The church in Francheville
- Location of Francheville
- Location within France Location within Grand Est
- Coordinates: 48°53′27″N 4°32′33″E
- Country: France
- Region: Grand Est
- Department: Marne
- Arrondissement: Châlons-en-Champagne
- Canton: Châlons-en-Champagne-3
- Intercommunality: CC de la Moivre à la Coole

Government
  - Mayor (2020–2026): Joël Pérardel
- Area^{1}: 9.43 km^{2} (3.64 sq mi)
- Elevation: 99 m (325 ft)
- Population (2023): 189
  - Density: 20.0/km^{2} (51.9/sq mi)
- Time zone: UTC+01:00 (CET)
  - Summer (DST): UTC+02:00 (CEST)
- INSEE/Postal code: 51259 /51240
- ^{1} French Land Register data, which excludes lakes, ponds, glaciers > 1 km^{2} (0.386 sq mi or 247 acres) and river estuaries.

Francheville (French pronunciation: [fʁɑ̃ʃvil]) is a commune in the Marne department in north-eastern France.

== See also ==
- Communes of the Marne department
