= Écury-sur-Coole =

- Commune
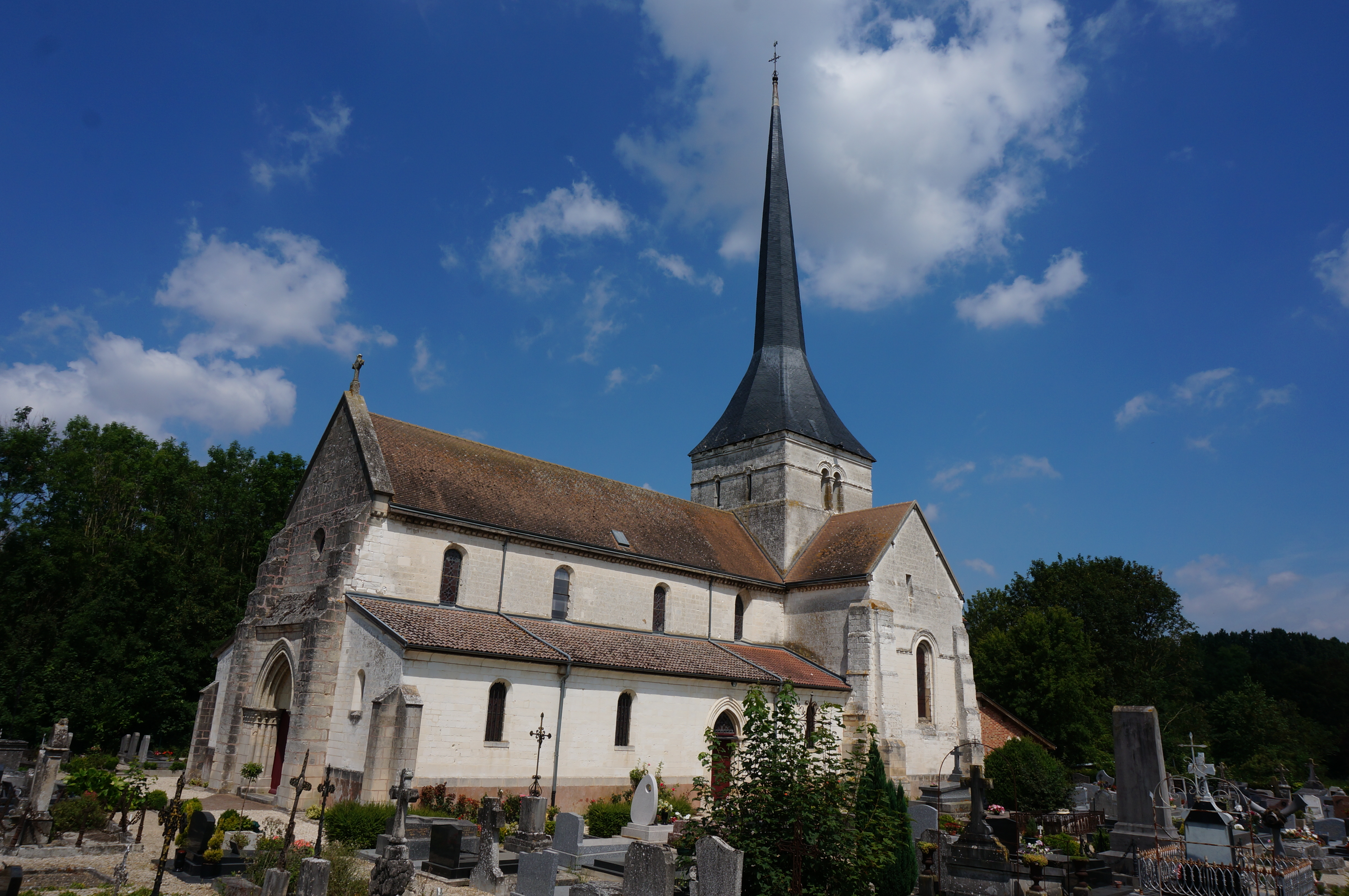
- The church in Écury-sur-Coole
- Location of Écury-sur-Coole
- Location within France Location within Grand Est
- Coordinates: 48°53′45″N 4°20′08″E
- Country: France
- Region: Grand Est
- Department: Marne
- Arrondissement: Châlons-en-Champagne
- Canton: Châlons-en-Champagne-3
- Intercommunality: CC de la Moivre à la Coole

Government
  - Mayor (2020–2026): Marc Deforge
- Area^{1}: 18.3 km^{2} (7.1 sq mi)
- Highest elevation: 142 m (466 ft)
- Lowest elevation: 82 m (269 ft)
- Population (2023): 492
  - Density: 26.9/km^{2} (69.6/sq mi)
- Time zone: UTC+01:00 (CET)
  - Summer (DST): UTC+02:00 (CEST)
- INSEE/Postal code: 51227 /51240
- ^{1} French Land Register data, which excludes lakes, ponds, glaciers > 1 km^{2} (0.386 sq mi or 247 acres) and river estuaries.

Écury-sur-Coole (French pronunciation: [ekyʁi syʁ kɔl]) is a commune in Marne, a department in northeastern France.

== See also ==
- Communes of the Marne department
