= Sogny-aux-Moulins =

- Commune
- Location of Sogny-aux-Moulins
- Location within France Location within Grand Est
- Coordinates: 48°54′09″N 4°23′52″E
- Country: France
- Region: Grand Est
- Department: Marne
- Arrondissement: Châlons-en-Champagne
- Canton: Châlons-en-Champagne-3

Government
  - Mayor (2020–2026): Jean-Jacques Pillet
- Area^{1}: 6.69 km^{2} (2.58 sq mi)
- Elevation: 86 m (282 ft)
- Population (2023): 110
  - Density: 16/km^{2} (43/sq mi)
- Time zone: UTC+01:00 (CET)
  - Summer (DST): UTC+02:00 (CEST)
- INSEE/Postal code: 51538 /51520
- ^{1} French Land Register data, which excludes lakes, ponds, glaciers > 1 km^{2} (0.386 sq mi or 247 acres) and river estuaries.

Sogny-aux-Moulins (French pronunciation: [sɔɲi o mulɛ̃]) is a commune in the Marne department in north-eastern France.

== See also ==
- Communes of the Marne department
