= Saint-Germain-la-Ville =

- Commune
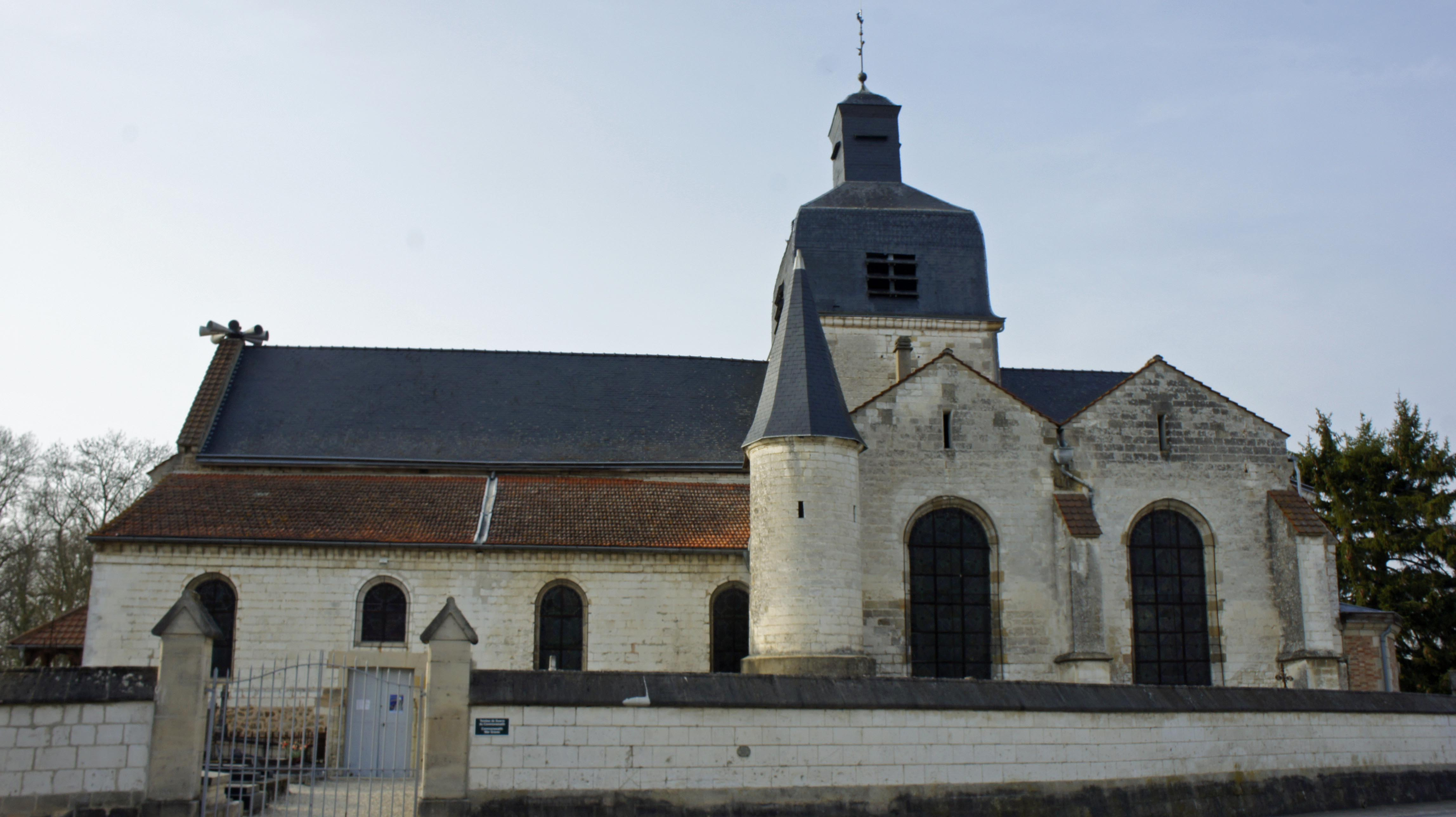
- The church in Saint-Germain-la-Ville
- Location of Saint-Germain-la-Ville
- Location within France Location within Grand Est
- Coordinates: 48°53′02″N 4°26′49″E
- Country: France
- Region: Grand Est
- Department: Marne
- Arrondissement: Châlons-en-Champagne
- Canton: Châlons-en-Champagne-3

Government
  - Mayor (2020–2026): René Schuller
- Area^{1}: 11.74 km^{2} (4.53 sq mi)
- Elevation: 89 m (292 ft)
- Population (2023): 652
  - Density: 55.5/km^{2} (144/sq mi)
- Time zone: UTC+01:00 (CET)
  - Summer (DST): UTC+02:00 (CEST)
- INSEE/Postal code: 51482 /51240
- ^{1} French Land Register data, which excludes lakes, ponds, glaciers > 1 km^{2} (0.386 sq mi or 247 acres) and river estuaries.

Saint-Germain-la-Ville (French pronunciation: [sɛ̃ ʒɛʁmɛ̃ la vil]) is a commune in the Marne department in north-eastern France.

== See also ==
- Communes of the Marne department
