= Cheppes-la-Prairie =

- Commune
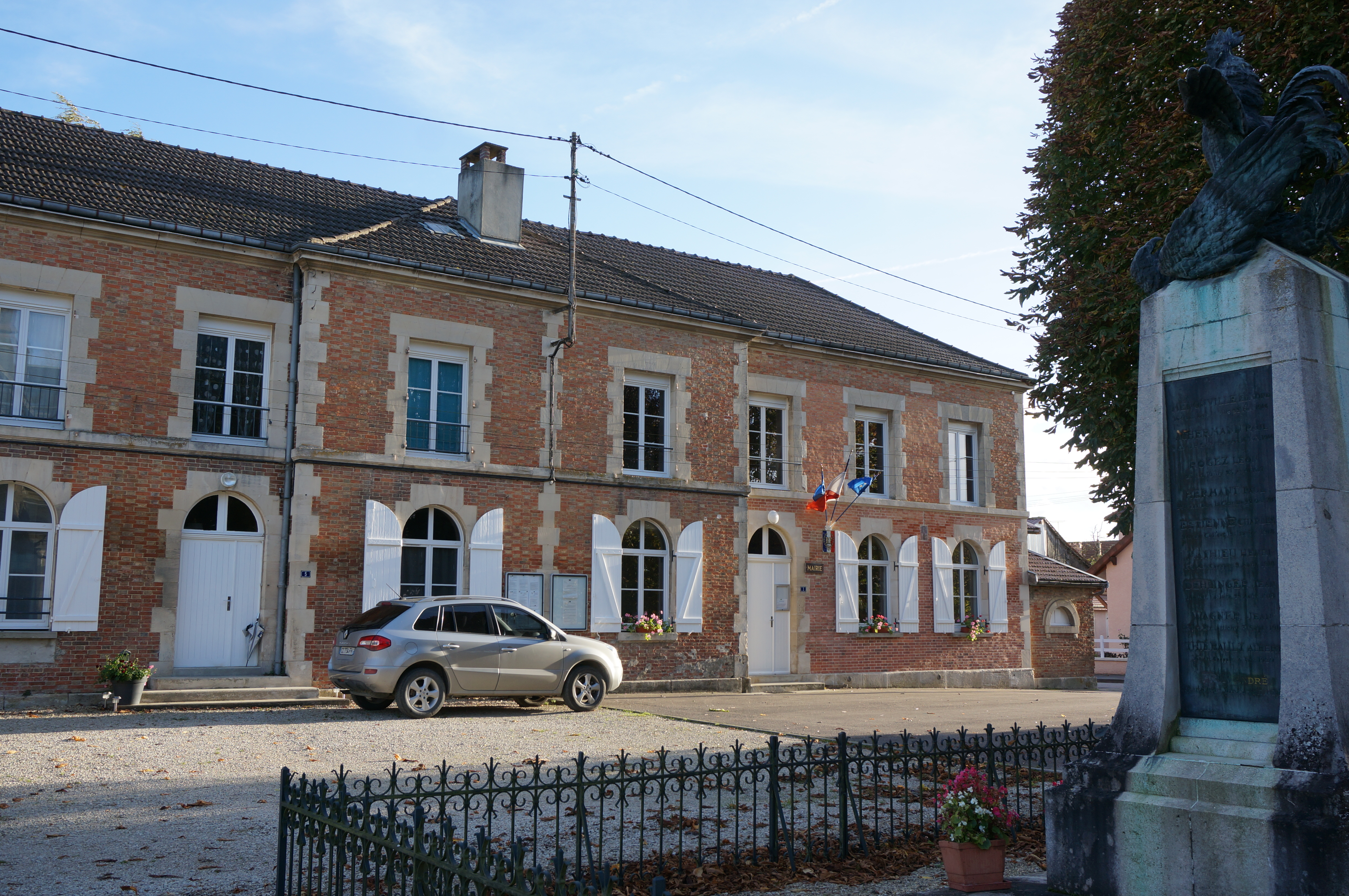
- The town hall in Cheppes-la-Prairie
- Location of Cheppes-la-Prairie
- Location within France Location within Grand Est
- Coordinates: 48°50′01″N 4°28′25″E
- Country: France
- Region: Grand Est
- Department: Marne
- Arrondissement: Châlons-en-Champagne
- Canton: Châlons-en-Champagne-3
- Intercommunality: CC de la Moivre à la Coole

Government
  - Mayor (2020–2026): William Mathieu
- Area^{1}: 20.02 km^{2} (7.73 sq mi)
- Elevation: 91 m (299 ft)
- Population (2023): 138
  - Density: 6.89/km^{2} (17.9/sq mi)
- Time zone: UTC+01:00 (CET)
  - Summer (DST): UTC+02:00 (CEST)
- INSEE/Postal code: 51148 /51240
- ^{1} French Land Register data, which excludes lakes, ponds, glaciers > 1 km^{2} (0.386 sq mi or 247 acres) and river estuaries.

Cheppes-la-Prairie (French pronunciation: [ʃɛp la pʁɛʁi]) is a commune in the Marne department in north-eastern France.

== See also ==
- Communes of the Marne department
