= Marson =

- Commune
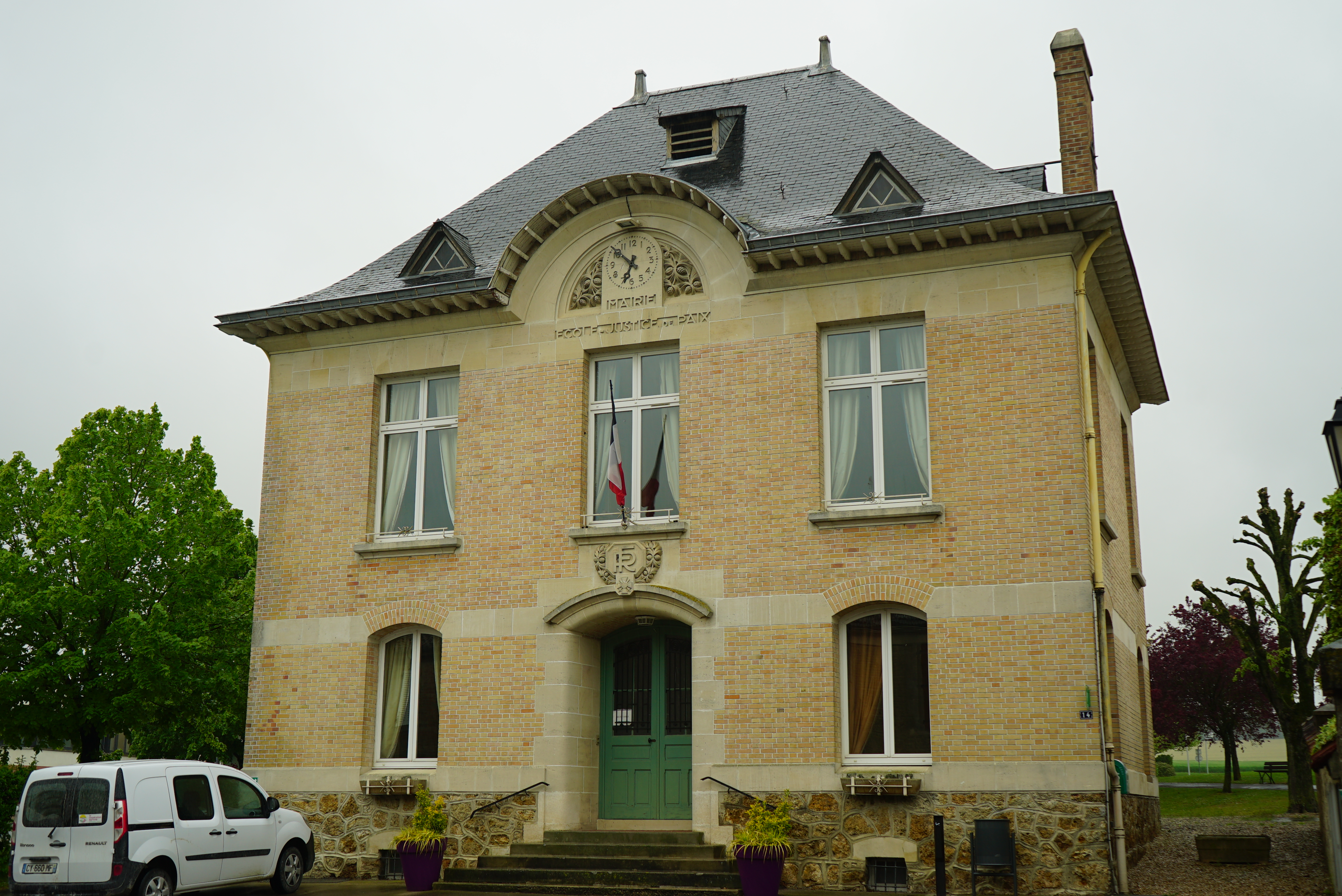
- The town hall in Marson
- Location of Marson
- Location within France Location within Grand Est
- Coordinates: 48°54′47″N 4°31′40″E
- Country: France
- Region: Grand Est
- Department: Marne
- Arrondissement: Châlons-en-Champagne
- Canton: Châlons-en-Champagne-3
- Intercommunality: CC de la Moivre à la Coole

Government
  - Mayor (2020–2026): Noël Voisin dit Lacroix
- Area^{1}: 30.76 km^{2} (11.88 sq mi)
- Elevation: 125 m (410 ft)
- Population (2023): 277
  - Density: 9.01/km^{2} (23.3/sq mi)
- Time zone: UTC+01:00 (CET)
  - Summer (DST): UTC+02:00 (CEST)
- INSEE/Postal code: 51354 /51240
- ^{1} French Land Register data, which excludes lakes, ponds, glaciers > 1 km^{2} (0.386 sq mi or 247 acres) and river estuaries.

Marson (French pronunciation: [maʁsɔ̃]) is a commune in the Marne department in north-eastern France.

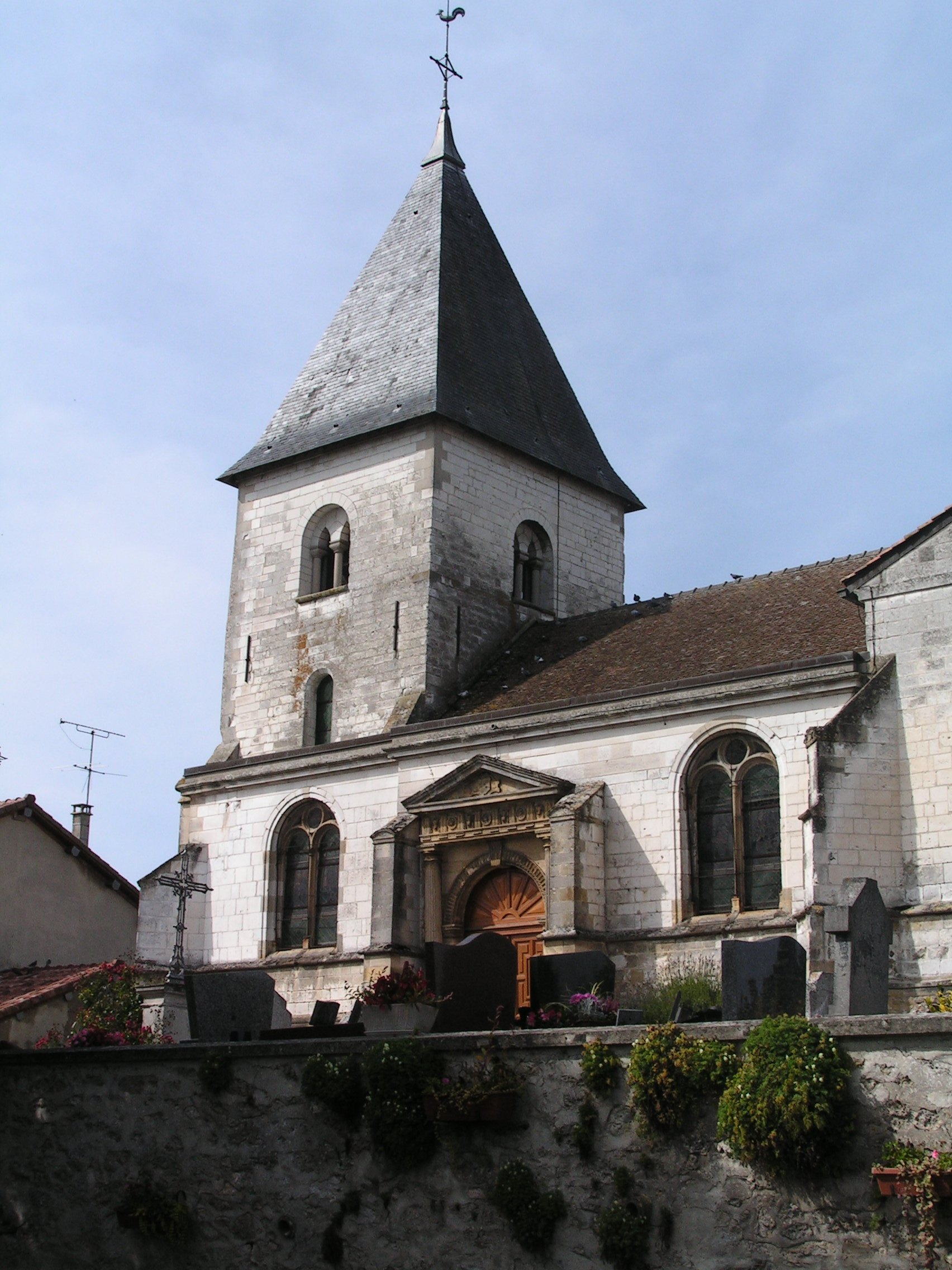
Church.

== See also ==
- Communes of the Marne department
