= Soudé =

- Commune
- Location of Soudé
- Location within France Location within Grand Est
- Coordinates: 48°44′25″N 4°18′44″E
- Country: France
- Region: Grand Est
- Department: Marne
- Arrondissement: Châlons-en-Champagne
- Canton: Châlons-en-Champagne-3
- Intercommunality: CA Châlons-en-Champagne

Government
  - Mayor (2020–2026): Michel Puissant
- Area^{1}: 31.94 km^{2} (12.33 sq mi)
- Elevation: 190 m (620 ft)
- Population (2023): 149
  - Density: 4.66/km^{2} (12.1/sq mi)
- Time zone: UTC+01:00 (CET)
  - Summer (DST): UTC+02:00 (CEST)
- INSEE/Postal code: 51555 /51320
- ^{1} French Land Register data, which excludes lakes, ponds, glaciers > 1 km^{2} (0.386 sq mi or 247 acres) and river estuaries.

Soudé (French pronunciation: [sude]) is a commune in the Marne department in north-eastern France.

== See also ==
- Communes of the Marne department
