= Soudron =

- Commune
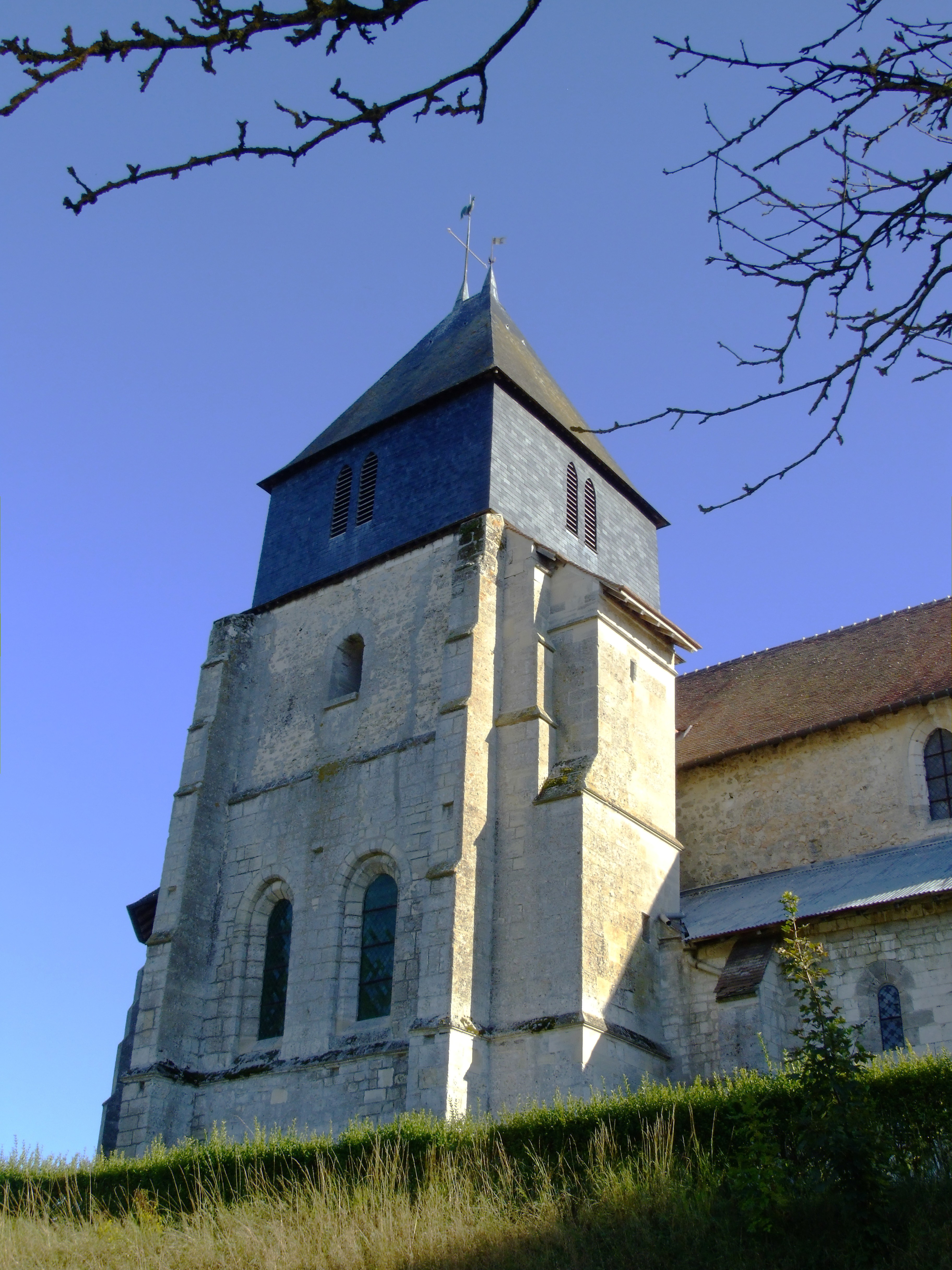
- The church in Soudron
- Location of Soudron
- Location within France Location within Grand Est
- Coordinates: 48°50′25″N 4°12′01″E
- Country: France
- Region: Grand Est
- Department: Marne
- Arrondissement: Châlons-en-Champagne
- Canton: Châlons-en-Champagne-3
- Intercommunality: CA Châlons-en-Champagne

Government
  - Mayor (2020–2026): Gabriel Remy
- Area^{1}: 43.02 km^{2} (16.61 sq mi)
- Elevation: 117 m (384 ft)
- Population (2023): 300
  - Density: 7.0/km^{2} (18/sq mi)
- Time zone: UTC+01:00 (CET)
  - Summer (DST): UTC+02:00 (CEST)
- INSEE/Postal code: 51556 /51320
- ^{1} French Land Register data, which excludes lakes, ponds, glaciers > 1 km^{2} (0.386 sq mi or 247 acres) and river estuaries.

Soudron (French pronunciation: [sudʁɔ̃]) is a commune in the Marne department in north-eastern France. The town of Soudron belongs to the canton of Châlons-en-Champagne-3 and the arrondissement of Châlons-en-Champagne. The number of inhabitants of Soudron in 2017 was 301.

The town's surface is 43.0 km². It is situated at an elevation of about 114 meters.

== See also ==
- Communes of the Marne department
