= Cheniers =

- Commune
- Coat of arms
- Location of Cheniers
- Location within France Location within Grand Est
- Coordinates: 48°53′09″N 4°14′40″E
- Country: France
- Region: Grand Est
- Department: Marne
- Arrondissement: Châlons-en-Champagne
- Canton: Châlons-en-Champagne-3
- Intercommunality: CA Châlons-en-Champagne

Government
  - Mayor (2020–2026): François Griffon
- Area^{1}: 15.58 km^{2} (6.02 sq mi)
- Highest elevation: 167 m (548 ft)
- Lowest elevation: 109 m (358 ft)
- Population (2023): 125
  - Density: 8.02/km^{2} (20.8/sq mi)
- Time zone: UTC+01:00 (CET)
  - Summer (DST): UTC+02:00 (CEST)
- INSEE/Postal code: 51146 /51510
- ^{1} French Land Register data, which excludes lakes, ponds, glaciers > 1 km^{2} (0.386 sq mi or 247 acres) and river estuaries.

Cheniers (French pronunciation: [ʃənje]) is a commune in the Marne department in north-eastern France.

== See also ==
- Communes of the Marne department
