= Sarry, Marne =

Sarry
- Commune
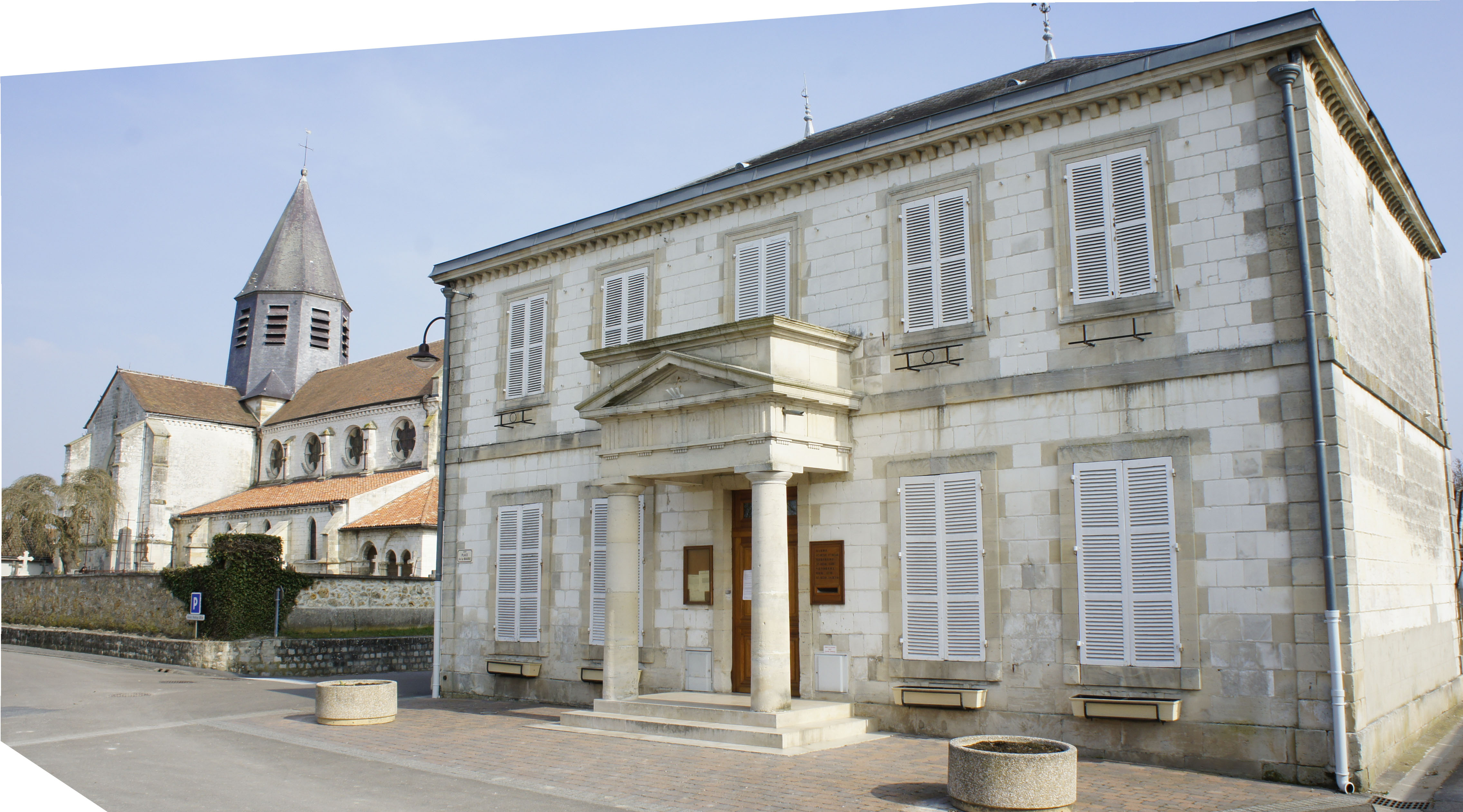
- The town hall and church in Sarry

- Coat of arms
- Location of Sarry
- Location within France Location within Grand Est
- Coordinates: 48°55′06″N 4°24′26″E
- Country: France
- Region: Grand Est
- Department: Marne
- Arrondissement: Châlons-en-Champagne
- Canton: Châlons-en-Champagne-3
- Intercommunality: CA Châlons-en-Champagne

Government
  - Mayor (2020–2026): Hervé Maillet
- Area^{1}: 20.01 km^{2} (7.73 sq mi)
- Elevation: 90 m (300 ft)
- Population (2023): 2,044
  - Density: 102.1/km^{2} (264.6/sq mi)
- Time zone: UTC+01:00 (CET)
  - Summer (DST): UTC+02:00 (CEST)
- INSEE/Postal code: 51525 /51520
- ^{1} French Land Register data, which excludes lakes, ponds, glaciers > 1 km^{2} (0.386 sq mi or 247 acres) and river estuaries.

Sarry (French pronunciation: [saʁi]) is a commune in the Marne department in north-eastern France.

== Population ==
Historical population
Year	Pop.	±% p.a.
1968	585	—
1975	1,060	+8.86%
1982	1,401	+4.06%
1990	2,084	+5.09%
1999	2,085	+0.01%
2007	2,069	−0.10%
2012	2,064	−0.05%
2017	2,046	−0.18%
2023	2,044	−0.02%
Source: INSEE

== See also ==
- Communes of the Marne department
