= Haussimont =

- Commune
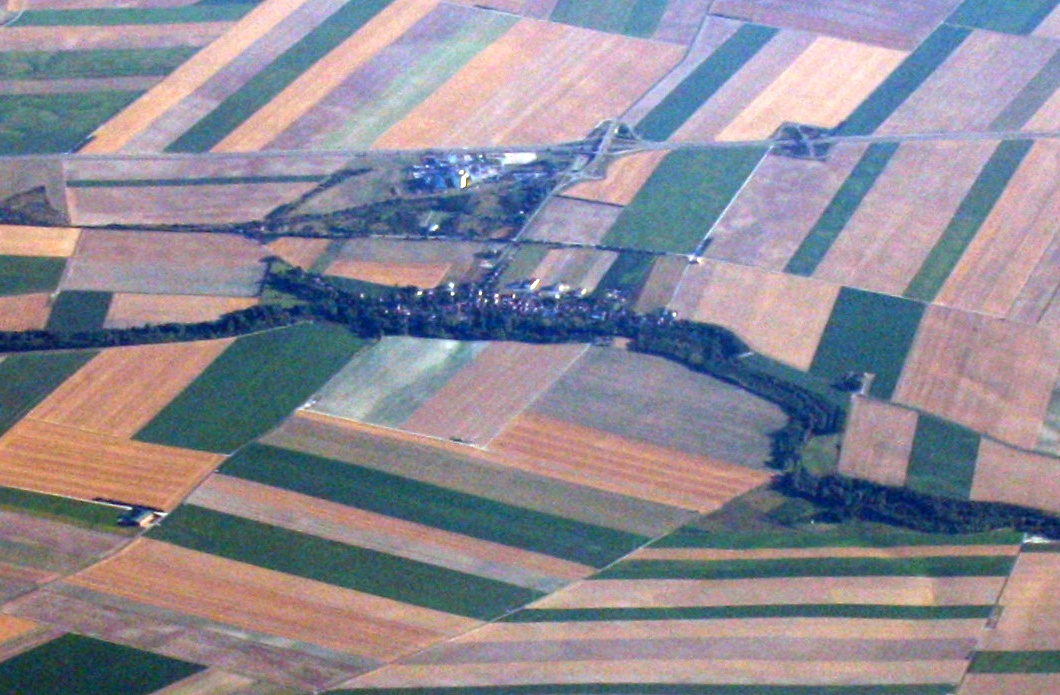
- An aerial view of Haussimont
- Location of Haussimont
- Location within France Location within Grand Est
- Coordinates: 48°44′58″N 4°10′02″E
- Country: France
- Region: Grand Est
- Department: Marne
- Arrondissement: Châlons-en-Champagne
- Canton: Châlons-en-Champagne-3
- Intercommunality: CA Châlons-en-Champagne

Government
  - Mayor (2020–2026): Bruno Roulot
- Area^{1}: 17.63 km^{2} (6.81 sq mi)
- Elevation: 162 m (531 ft)
- Population (2023): 139
  - Density: 7.88/km^{2} (20.4/sq mi)
- Time zone: UTC+01:00 (CET)
  - Summer (DST): UTC+02:00 (CEST)
- INSEE/Postal code: 51285 /51320
- ^{1} French Land Register data, which excludes lakes, ponds, glaciers > 1 km^{2} (0.386 sq mi or 247 acres) and river estuaries.

Haussimont (French pronunciation: [osimɔ̃]) is a commune in the Marne department in north-eastern France, approximately 48 miles (77 km) south of Reims.

== See also ==
- Communes of the Marne department
