= Bussy-Lettrée =

- Commune
- Location of Bussy-Lettrée
- Location within France Location within Grand Est
- Coordinates: 48°48′20″N 4°15′40″E
- Country: France
- Region: Grand Est
- Department: Marne
- Arrondissement: Châlons-en-Champagne
- Canton: Châlons-en-Champagne-3
- Intercommunality: CA Châlons-en-Champagne

Government
  - Mayor (2020–2026): Pierre Poupart
- Area^{1}: 33.48 km^{2} (12.93 sq mi)
- Elevation: 129 m (423 ft)
- Population (2023): 307
  - Density: 9.17/km^{2} (23.7/sq mi)
- Time zone: UTC+01:00 (CET)
  - Summer (DST): UTC+02:00 (CEST)
- INSEE/Postal code: 51099 /51320
- ^{1} French Land Register data, which excludes lakes, ponds, glaciers > 1 km^{2} (0.386 sq mi or 247 acres) and river estuaries.

Bussy-Lettrée (French pronunciation: [bysi lɛtʁe]) is a commune in the Marne department in northeastern France.

== Population ==
Historical population
Year	Pop.	±% p.a.
1968	237	—
1975	221	−0.99%
1982	249	+1.72%
1990	233	−0.83%
1999	240	+0.33%
2007	298	+2.74%
2012	328	+1.94%
2017	341	+0.78%
2023	307	−1.74%
Source: INSEE

== See also ==
- Communes of the Marne department
