= Faux-Vésigneul =

- Commune
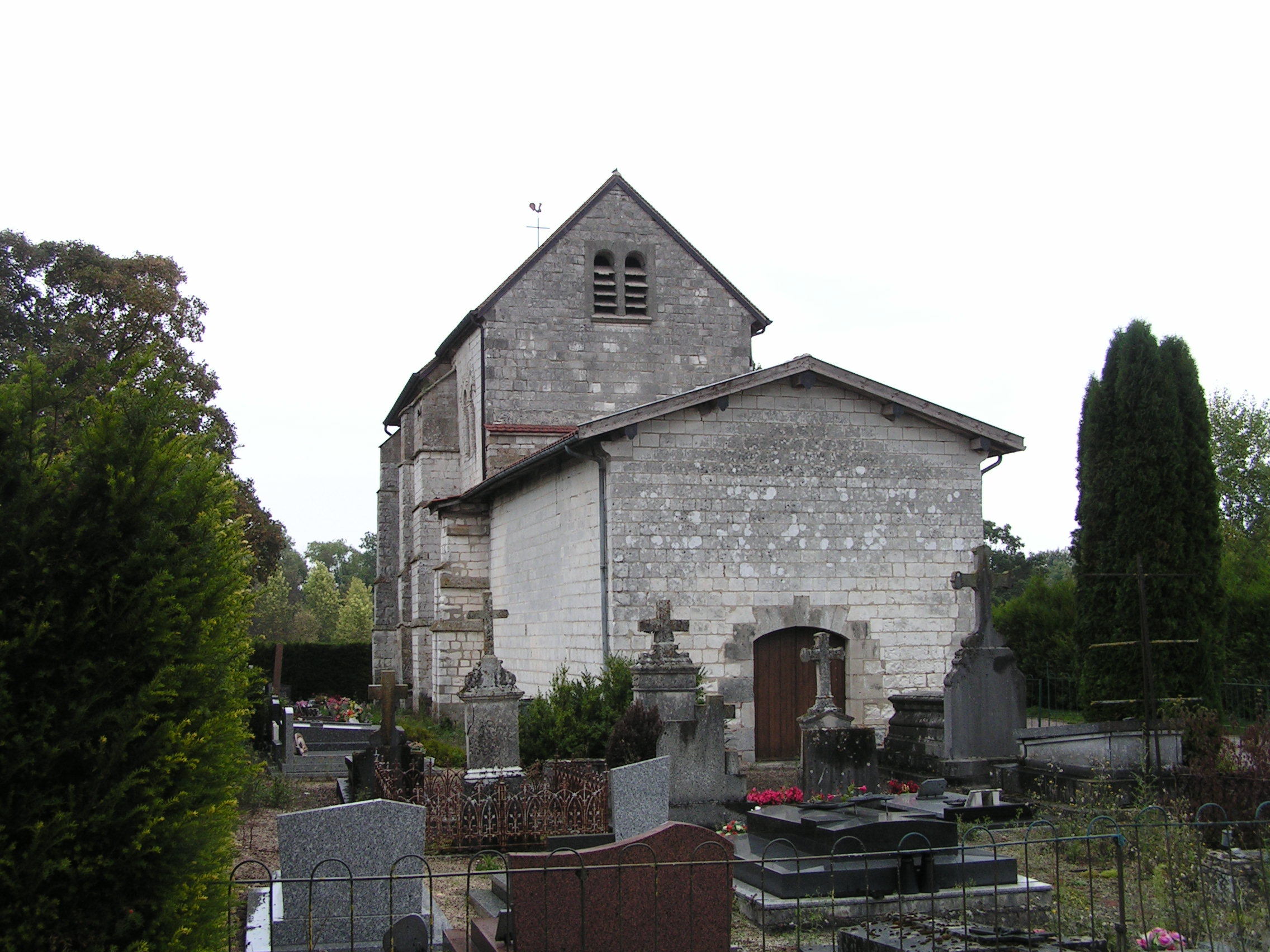
- The church in Faux-Vésigneul
- Location of Faux-Vésigneul
- Location within France Location within Grand Est
- Coordinates: 48°46′52″N 4°24′03″E
- Country: France
- Region: Grand Est
- Department: Marne
- Arrondissement: Châlons-en-Champagne
- Canton: Châlons-en-Champagne-3
- Intercommunality: CC de la Moivre à la Coole

Government
  - Mayor (2020–2026): Jean-Christophe Mangeart
- Area^{1}: 39.42 km^{2} (15.22 sq mi)
- Highest elevation: 141 m (463 ft)
- Lowest elevation: 128 m (420 ft)
- Population (2023): 238
  - Density: 6.04/km^{2} (15.6/sq mi)
- Time zone: UTC+01:00 (CET)
  - Summer (DST): UTC+02:00 (CEST)
- INSEE/Postal code: 51244 /51320
- ^{1} French Land Register data, which excludes lakes, ponds, glaciers > 1 km^{2} (0.386 sq mi or 247 acres) and river estuaries.

Faux-Vésigneul (French pronunciation: [fo veziɲœl]) is a commune in the Marne department in north-eastern France.

== See also ==
- Communes of the Marne department
