= Saint-Quentin-sur-Coole =

- Commune
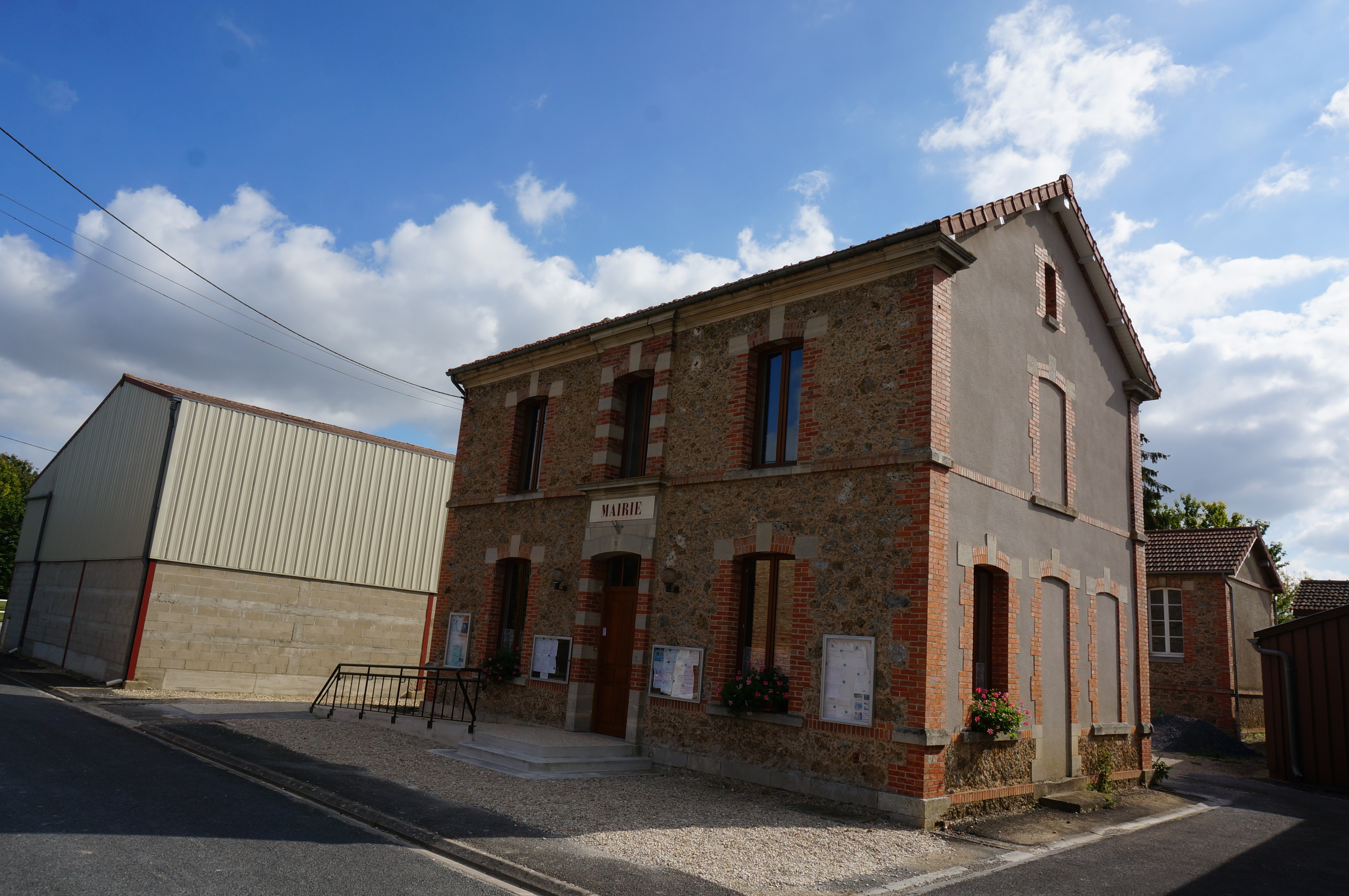
- The town hall in Saint-Quentin-sur-Coole
- Location of Saint-Quentin-sur-Coole
- Location within France Location within Grand Est
- Coordinates: 48°51′18″N 4°19′45″E
- Country: France
- Region: Grand Est
- Department: Marne
- Arrondissement: Châlons-en-Champagne
- Canton: Châlons-en-Champagne-3

Government
  - Mayor (2020–2026): Maxime Joly
- Area^{1}: 8.79 km^{2} (3.39 sq mi)
- Elevation: 125 m (410 ft)
- Population (2023): 104
  - Density: 11.8/km^{2} (30.6/sq mi)
- Time zone: UTC+01:00 (CET)
  - Summer (DST): UTC+02:00 (CEST)
- INSEE/Postal code: 51512 /51240
- ^{1} French Land Register data, which excludes lakes, ponds, glaciers > 1 km^{2} (0.386 sq mi or 247 acres) and river estuaries.

Saint-Quentin-sur-Coole (French pronunciation: [sɛ̃ kɑ̃tɛ̃ syʁ kɔl]) is a commune in the Marne department in north-eastern France.

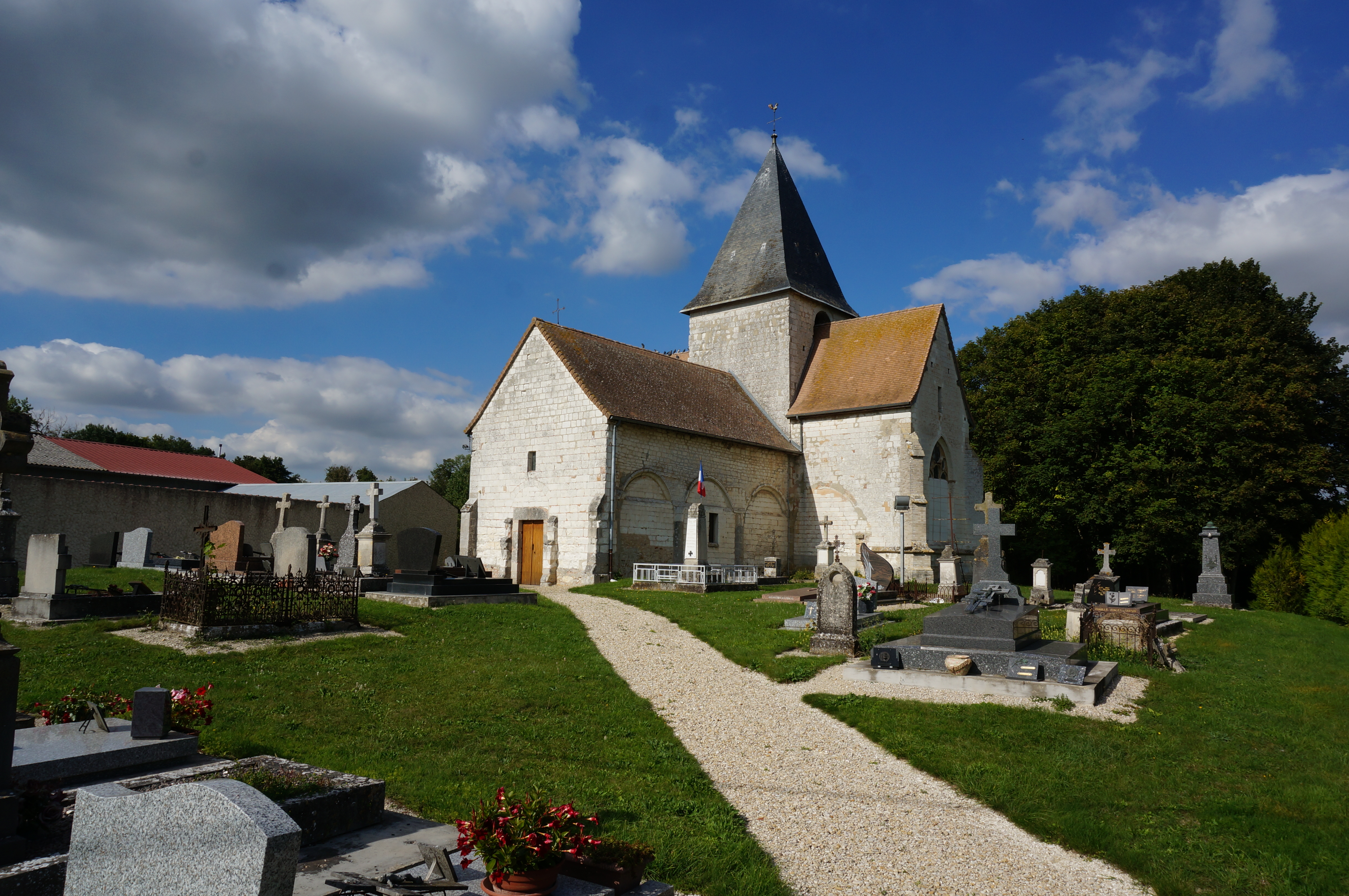
Church.

== See also ==
- Communes of the Marne department
