= Mairy-sur-Marne =

- Commune
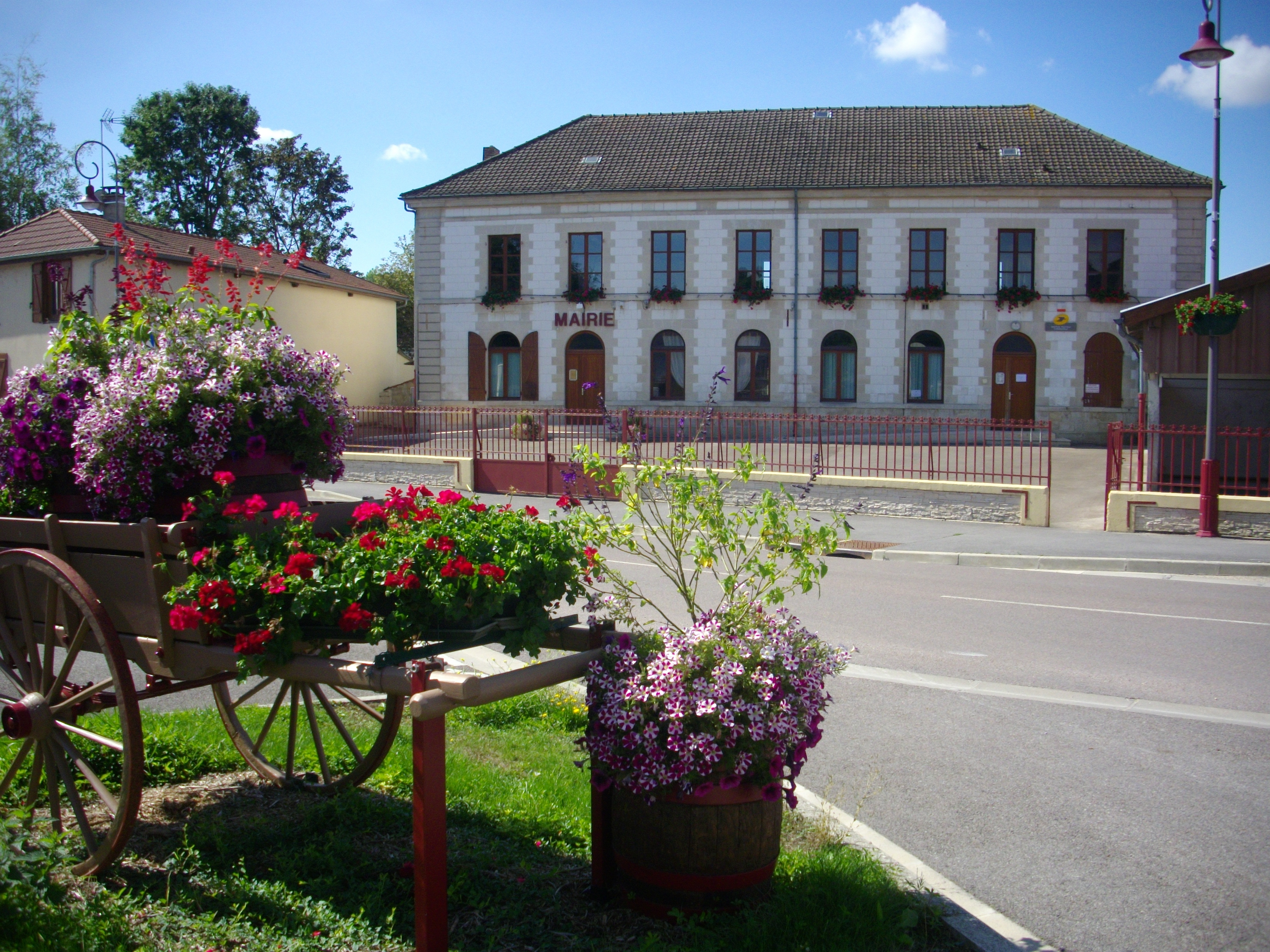
- The town hall in Mairy-sur-Marne
- Location of Mairy-sur-Marne
- Location within France Location within Grand Est
- Coordinates: 48°52′59″N 4°24′36″E
- Country: France
- Region: Grand Est
- Department: Marne
- Arrondissement: Châlons-en-Champagne
- Canton: Châlons-en-Champagne-3
- Intercommunality: CC de la Moivre à la Coole

Government
  - Mayor (2020–2026): Catherine Pujol
- Area^{1}: 20.78 km^{2} (8.02 sq mi)
- Elevation: 83 m (272 ft)
- Population (2023): 565
  - Density: 27.2/km^{2} (70.4/sq mi)
- Time zone: UTC+01:00 (CET)
  - Summer (DST): UTC+02:00 (CEST)
- INSEE/Postal code: 51339 /51240
- ^{1} French Land Register data, which excludes lakes, ponds, glaciers > 1 km^{2} (0.386 sq mi or 247 acres) and river estuaries.

Mairy-sur-Marne (French pronunciation: [mɛʁi syʁ maʁn], literally Mairy on Marne) is a commune in the Marne department in north-eastern France. The village is situated on the river Marne, which travels through Chalons-en-Champagne, Épernay and on to Paris where it links on to the Seine. In the centre of the village is a church, the mayor's office and the village's 17th century Chateau.

Chateau de Mairy, also known as Chateau de Jaques, is a 'Monument Historique' set on 30 acres of grounds with its own private lake and a pigeonnerie tower which also serves as a chapel.

James II stayed regularly in the Chateau during his exile in France.

It was owned by the Loisson de Guinaumont since it was built in 1676 and was owned by the Count of Guinaumont until 2004 when he died aged 98.

It is now used as a period guest house and hosts travelers, biking groups and charming events such as weddings.

== See also ==
- Communes of the Marne department
