= Nuisement-sur-Coole =

- Commune
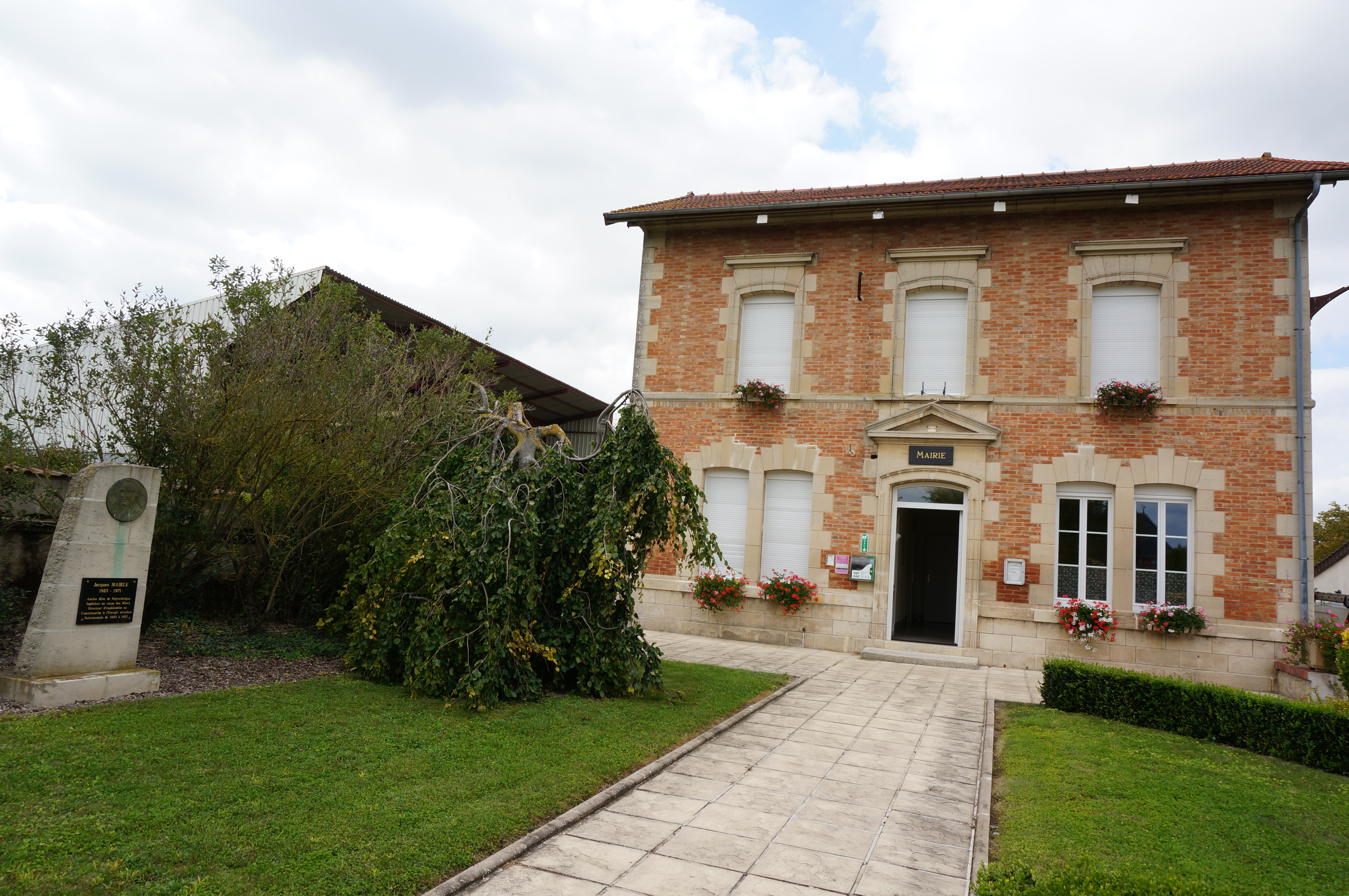
- The town hall in Nuisement-sur-Coole

- Coat of arms
- Location of Nuisement-sur-Coole
- Location within France Location within Grand Est
- Coordinates: 48°52′42″N 4°18′39″E
- Country: France
- Region: Grand Est
- Department: Marne
- Arrondissement: Châlons-en-Champagne
- Canton: Châlons-en-Champagne-3
- Intercommunality: CC de la Moivre à la Coole

Government
  - Mayor (2025–2026): Daniel Ponsignon
- Area^{1}: 15.13 km^{2} (5.84 sq mi)
- Elevation: 96 m (315 ft)
- Population (2023): 384
  - Density: 25.4/km^{2} (65.7/sq mi)
- Time zone: UTC+01:00 (CET)
  - Summer (DST): UTC+02:00 (CEST)
- INSEE/Postal code: 51409 /51240
- ^{1} French Land Register data, which excludes lakes, ponds, glaciers > 1 km^{2} (0.386 sq mi or 247 acres) and river estuaries.

Nuisement-sur-Coole (French pronunciation: [nɥizmɑ̃ syʁ kɔl]) is a commune in the Marne département in north-eastern France.

== See also ==
- Communes of the Marne department
