= Canton of Châlons-en-Champagne-3 =

Administrative division of the Marne department in northeastern France

Coordinates: 48.95°N 4.37°E

The canton of Châlons-en-Champagne-3 is an administrative division of the Marne department, northeastern France. Its borders were modified at the French canton reorganisation which came into effect in March 2015. Its seat is in Châlons-en-Champagne.

It consists of the following communes:

1. Breuvery-sur-Coole
2. Bussy-Lettrée
3. Cernon
4. Châlons-en-Champagne (partly)
5. Cheniers
6. Cheppes-la-Prairie
7. Chepy
8. Coupetz
9. Coupéville
10. Dampierre-sur-Moivre
11. Dommartin-Lettrée
12. Écury-sur-Coole
13. L'Épine
14. Faux-Vésigneul
15. Francheville
16. Le Fresne
17. Haussimont
18. Lenharrée
19. Mairy-sur-Marne
20. Marson
21. Moivre
22. Moncetz-Longevas
23. Montépreux
24. Nuisement-sur-Coole
25. Omey
26. Pogny
27. Saint-Étienne-au-Temple
28. Saint-Germain-la-Ville
29. Saint-Jean-sur-Moivre
30. Saint-Martin-aux-Champs
31. Saint-Memmie
32. Saint-Quentin-sur-Coole
33. Sarry
34. Sogny-aux-Moulins
35. Sommesous
36. Soudé
37. Soudron
38. Togny-aux-Bœufs
39. Vassimont-et-Chapelaine
40. Vatry
41. Vésigneul-sur-Marne
42. Vitry-la-Ville
