= Moivre, Marne =

Moivre
- Commune
- Location of Moivre
- Location within France Location within Grand Est
- Coordinates: 48°55′29″N 4°39′38″E
- Country: France
- Region: Grand Est
- Department: Marne
- Arrondissement: Châlons-en-Champagne
- Canton: Châlons-en-Champagne-3
- Intercommunality: CC de la Moivre à la Coole

Government
  - Mayor (2020–2026): Céline Robert
- Area^{1}: 21.84 km^{2} (8.43 sq mi)
- Elevation: 126 m (413 ft)
- Population (2023): 54
  - Density: 2.5/km^{2} (6.4/sq mi)
- Time zone: UTC+01:00 (CET)
  - Summer (DST): UTC+02:00 (CEST)
- INSEE/Postal code: 51371 /51240
- ^{1} French Land Register data, which excludes lakes, ponds, glaciers > 1 km^{2} (0.386 sq mi or 247 acres) and river estuaries.

Moivre (French pronunciation: [mwavʁ]) is a commune in the Marne department in north-eastern France.

== See also ==
- Communes of the Marne department
