= Omey (commune) =

- Commune
- Coat of arms
- Location of Omey
- Location within France Location within Grand Est
- Coordinates: 48°50′58″N 4°29′41″E
- Country: France
- Region: Grand Est
- Department: Marne
- Arrondissement: Châlons-en-Champagne
- Canton: Châlons-en-Champagne-3

Government
  - Mayor (2020–2026): Eric Vetu
- Area^{1}: 3.94 km^{2} (1.52 sq mi)
- Elevation: 101 m (331 ft)
- Population (2023): 203
  - Density: 51.5/km^{2} (133/sq mi)
- Time zone: UTC+01:00 (CET)
  - Summer (DST): UTC+02:00 (CEST)
- INSEE/Postal code: 51415 /51240
- ^{1} French Land Register data, which excludes lakes, ponds, glaciers > 1 km^{2} (0.386 sq mi or 247 acres) and river estuaries.

Omey (French pronunciation: [ɔmɛ]) is a commune in the Marne department in north-eastern France.

It is bordered by a canal and river; the Canal Latéral à la Marne, and la Marne, respectively.

== See also ==
- Communes of the Marne department
