= Cernon, Marne =

Cernon
- Commune
- Location of Cernon
- Location within France Location within Grand Est
- Coordinates: 48°50′28″N 4°20′41″E
- Country: France
- Region: Grand Est
- Department: Marne
- Arrondissement: Châlons-en-Champagne
- Canton: Châlons-en-Champagne-3
- Intercommunality: CC de la Moivre à la Coole

Government
  - Mayor (2020–2026): Jean-Marie Rossignon
- Area^{1}: 16.1 km^{2} (6.2 sq mi)
- Population (2023): 131
  - Density: 8.14/km^{2} (21.1/sq mi)
- Demonym(s): Cernonnais, Cernonnaise
- Time zone: UTC+01:00 (CET)
  - Summer (DST): UTC+02:00 (CEST)
- INSEE/Postal code: 51106 /51240
- ^{1} French Land Register data, which excludes lakes, ponds, glaciers > 1 km^{2} (0.386 sq mi or 247 acres) and river estuaries.

Cernon (French pronunciation: [sɛʁnɔ̃]) is a commune in the Marne department in north-eastern France.

== See also ==
- Communes of the Marne department
