= Vitry-la-Ville =

- Commune
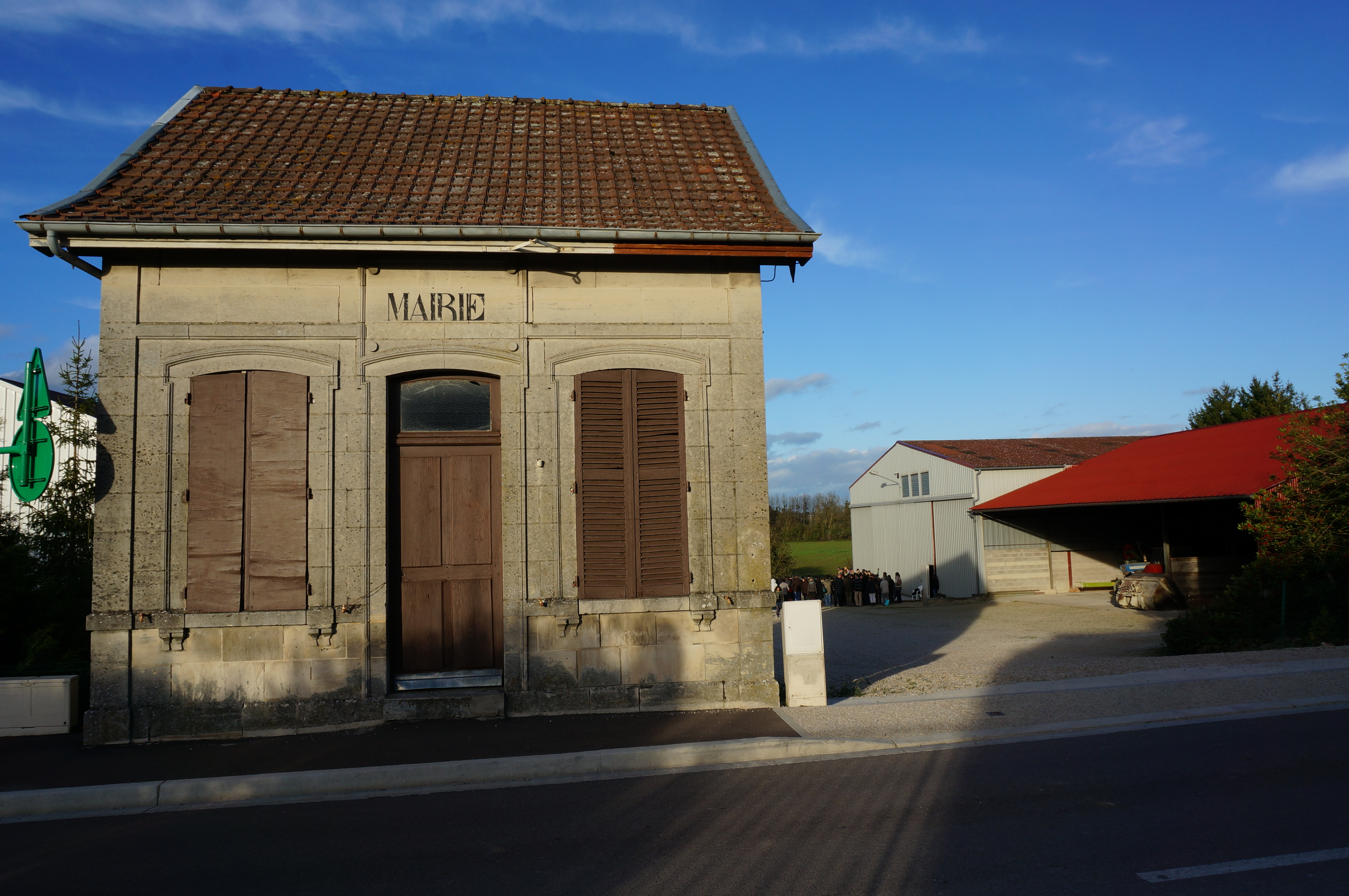
- The town hall in Vitry-la-Ville
- Location of Vitry-la-Ville
- Location within France Location within Grand Est
- Coordinates: 48°50′34″N 4°27′34″E
- Country: France
- Region: Grand Est
- Department: Marne
- Arrondissement: Châlons-en-Champagne
- Canton: Châlons-en-Champagne-3
- Intercommunality: Moivre à la Coole

Government
  - Mayor (2020–2026): André Mellier
- Area^{1}: 9.24 km^{2} (3.57 sq mi)
- Elevation: 90 m (300 ft)
- Population (2023): 359
  - Density: 38.9/km^{2} (101/sq mi)
- Time zone: UTC+01:00 (CET)
  - Summer (DST): UTC+02:00 (CEST)
- INSEE/Postal code: 51648 /51240
- ^{1} French Land Register data, which excludes lakes, ponds, glaciers > 1 km^{2} (0.386 sq mi or 247 acres) and river estuaries.

Vitry-la-Ville (French pronunciation: [vitʁi la vil]) is a commune in the Marne department in north-eastern France.

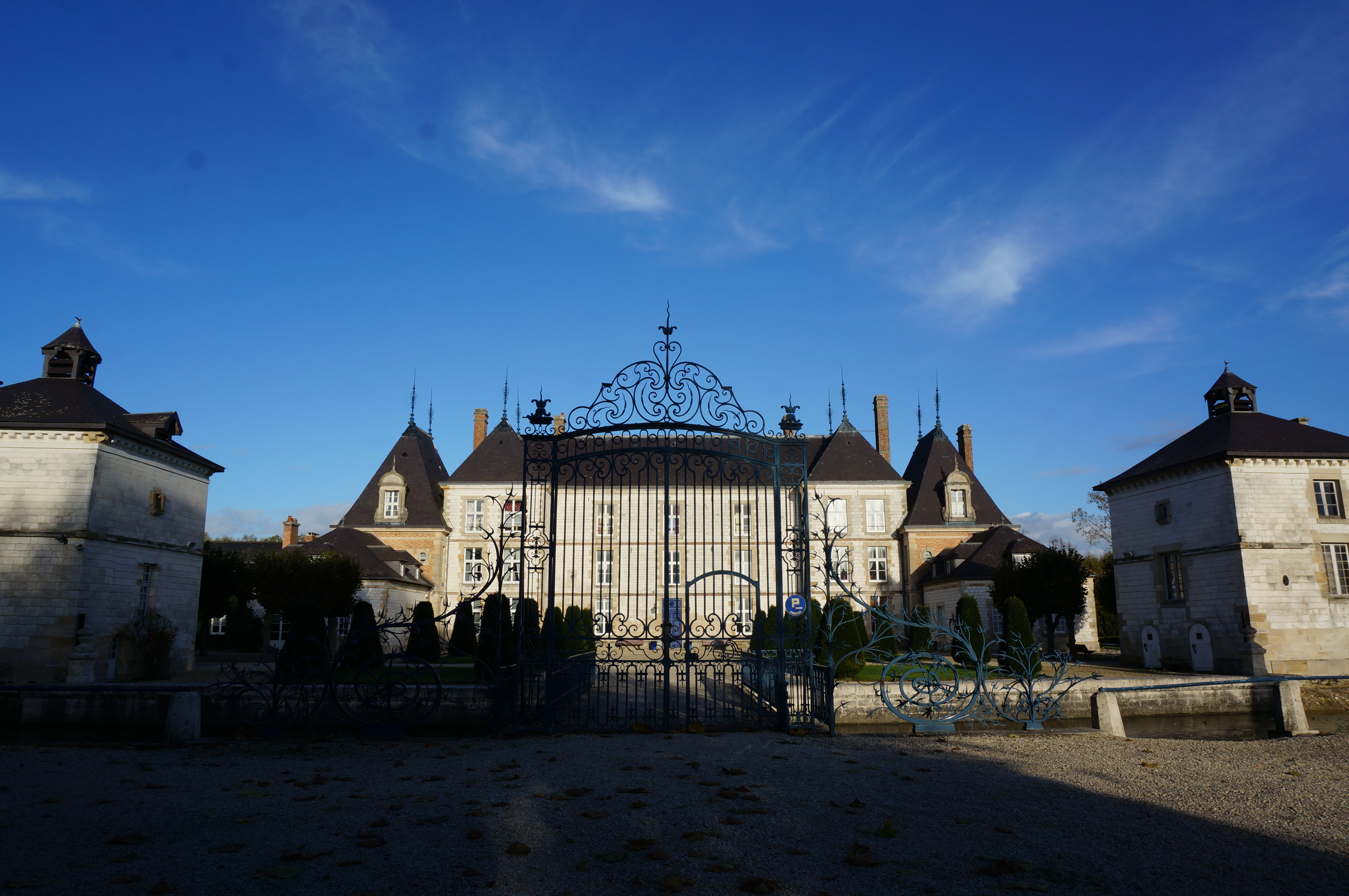
Castel.

== See also ==
- Communes of the Marne department
