= Vésigneul-sur-Marne =

- Commune
- Location of Vésigneul-sur-Marne
- Location within France Location within Grand Est
- Coordinates: 48°52′20″N 4°27′37″E
- Country: France
- Region: Grand Est
- Department: Marne
- Arrondissement: Châlons-en-Champagne
- Canton: Châlons-en-Champagne-3
- Intercommunality: CC de la Moivre à la Coole

Government
  - Mayor (2020–2026): Alexandre Bodin
- Area^{1}: 7.86 km^{2} (3.03 sq mi)
- Elevation: 87 m (285 ft)
- Population (2023): 240
  - Density: 31/km^{2} (79/sq mi)
- Time zone: UTC+01:00 (CET)
  - Summer (DST): UTC+02:00 (CEST)
- INSEE/Postal code: 51616 /51240
- ^{1} French Land Register data, which excludes lakes, ponds, glaciers > 1 km^{2} (0.386 sq mi or 247 acres) and river estuaries.

Vésigneul-sur-Marne (French pronunciation: [veziɲœl syʁ maʁn], literally Vésigneul on Marne) is a commune in the Marne department in Grand Est in north-eastern France.

== See also ==
- Communes of the Marne department
