= Thibie =

- Commune
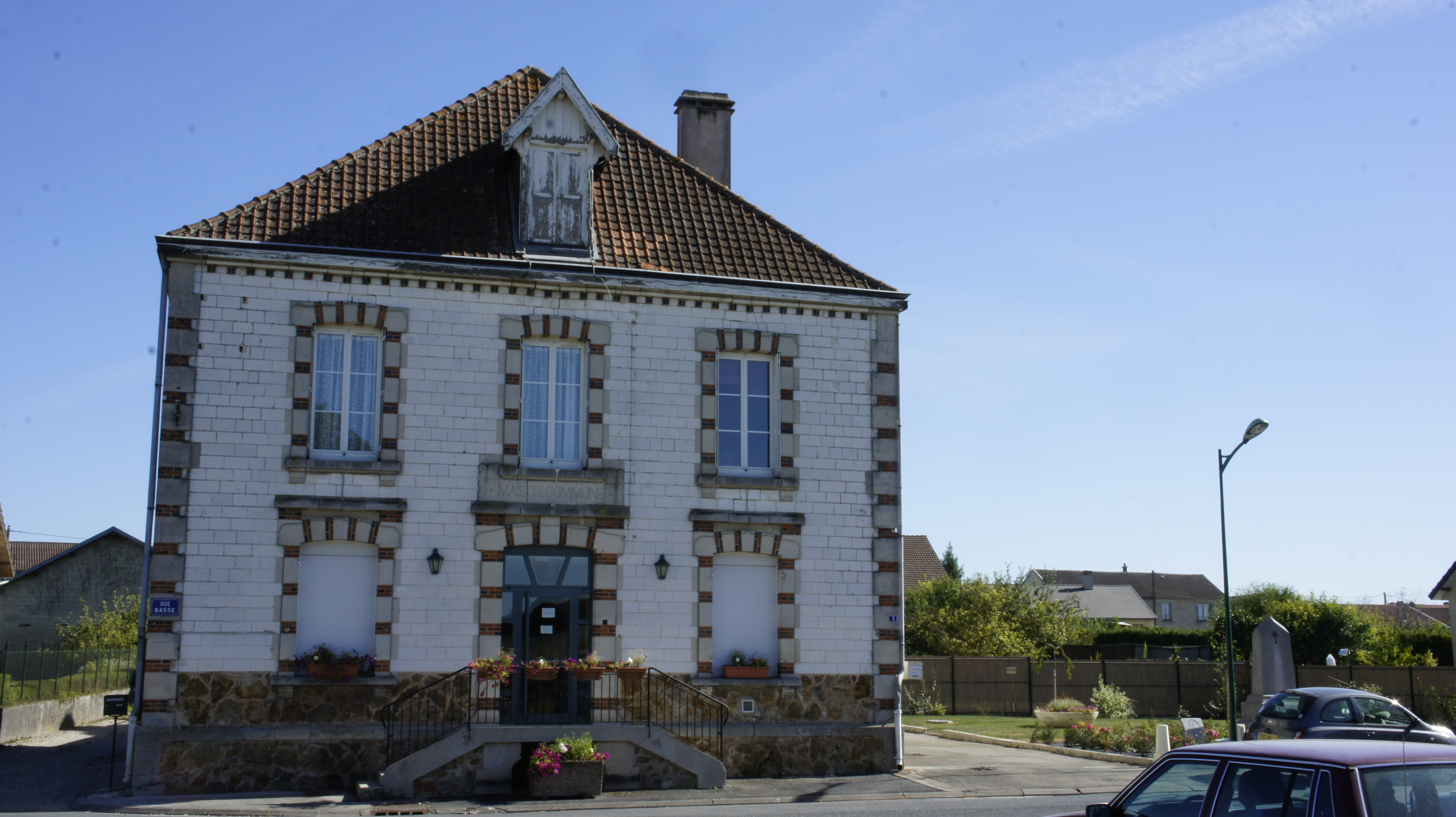
- The town hall in Thibie
- Location of Thibie
- Location within France Location within Grand Est
- Coordinates: 48°55′49″N 4°12′59″E
- Country: France
- Region: Grand Est
- Department: Marne
- Arrondissement: Châlons-en-Champagne
- Canton: Châlons-en-Champagne-2
- Intercommunality: CA Châlons-en-Champagne

Government
  - Mayor (2020–2026): Hervé Perrein
- Area^{1}: 10.46 km^{2} (4.04 sq mi)
- Elevation: 101 m (331 ft)
- Population (2023): 291
  - Density: 27.8/km^{2} (72.1/sq mi)
- Time zone: UTC+01:00 (CET)
  - Summer (DST): UTC+02:00 (CEST)
- INSEE/Postal code: 51566 /51510
- ^{1} French Land Register data, which excludes lakes, ponds, glaciers > 1 km^{2} (0.386 sq mi or 247 acres) and river estuaries.

Thibie (French pronunciation: [tibi]) is a commune in north-eastern France, situated in the Marne department in the region of Grand Est.

== History ==
The name is attested as Thetbiacum (805), Tibiacum (1107), Thebeium (1153), and Thiebye (1254). The name originates from "Thiepo", a Germanic name, and the suffix "iacum", from Latin denoting ownership.

A decree from Charles the Bald in 805 confirms the right of the Châlons church to demand tithes from the people of Thibie. The owner of the Chalons Cathedral became owner of the lands of Thibie by 1639.

== Geography ==
The source of the Gironde estuary empties into a tributary of the left bank of Marne in Saint-Gibrien after 10 km.

== See also ==
- Communes of the Marne department
