= NATO Dispersed Operating Bases =

NATO air bases in France

- Part of the Cold War
- Map of NATO Air Bases in France during the Cold War
| Date | 1951-1966 |
| Location | France |
| Result | Turned over to French military in accordance with French Withdrawal From NATO Integrated Military Structure |

NATO Dispersed Operating Bases (DOBs) were developed to improve air power survival when NATO began planning for tactical air bases and aircraft in western Europe during the early Cold War years of the 1950s.

== History ==
Dispersal tactics and protective measures were very common during World War II and practiced by all nations. The USAAF was less concerned than its allies about base defence and dispersal due to the total air superiority and unlimited resources of aircraft, aircrews and ground personnel to replace combat losses.

After D-Day as allied tactical air forces moved rapidly across France, investment in base and aircraft survival was impractical. It was quicker and cheaper to use captured Luftwaffe facilities. By 1948 these small airfields had been abandoned and most structures were removed or were in a state of disrepair.

With the advent of the Cold War, NATO faced several problems when attempting to solve the air power survival equation. Planning for first strike survival in both conventional and nuclear wars had to be considered. The main air bases were built on small parcels of land with very limited dispersal space. It was decided to build DOBs at least 30 miles (48 kilometers) from the main air bases to be used in the event of an emergency. The goal was to have no more than one fighter squadron on each main or dispersed base in the event of war.

Beginning in 1953 USAFE DOBs were constructed in France and were completed in about two years. Each was built to a standard NATO design of a 7,900' runway and the ability to space parked aircraft as far apart as possible by the construction of a circular marguerite system of hardstands that could be revetted later with earth for added protection.

Typically the marguerite consisted of fifteen to eighteen hardstands around a large central hangar. Each hardstand held one or two aircraft, and allowed the planes to be spaced approximately 150 feet (46 meters) apart. Each squadron was assigned to a separate hangar/hardstand complex.

Four DOBs were built for USAFE use. They were designed to have the capability to base about 30 aircraft, along with a few permanent buildings serviced with utilities and space for a tent city to house personnel.

No USAFE flying units were permanently assigned to these bases, and they were used for dispersal training only. However, they did require the same level of equipment as a standard air base. In addition, security personnel were required to control base access, guard equipment, munitions and supplies stored on the facility, as well as prevent vandalism.

By 1959 due to the reduction of NATO/USAF tactical fighter and bomb wings in France, the need for these DOBs was virtually eliminated. Three were transferred to the U. S. Army to reduce the cost of maintaining them and the other was turned over to the French Government.

== Base descriptions ==
=== Luneville-Chenevieres AB ===
Luneville-Chenevieres Air Base 48°31′40″N 006°38′06″E is located in the Meurthe-et-Moselle Département about 8 miles southeast of Lunéville; 190 miles east of Paris

The former base is under French Army control. It was renamed Quartier La Salle and has been used for equipment storage and as a communications facility.

=== Vatry AB ===
Vatry Air Base 48°46′37″N 004°11′14″E is located in the Marne Département along the Route nationale 14 (N14), about 14 miles southwest of Châlons-en-Champagne; 100 miles east of Paris.

The former NATO base has been redeveloped as an international cargo and transport facility Châlons Vatry Airport. Very little remains of the old USAF base.

=== Vouziers-Sechault AB ===
Vouziers-Sechault Air Base 49°16′36″N 004°45′12″E is located in the Ardennes Département about 15 miles north-northwest of Sainte-Menehould; 117 miles east-northeast of Paris.

Currently the former base is a reserve French Air and Space Force facility.

=== Vitry-Brienne AB ===
Vitry-Brienne Air Base 48°25′44″N 004°28′49″E is located in the Aube Département, approximately 17 miles northwest of Bar-sur-Aube; 117 miles southeast of Paris.

In 1970 it was purchased by the Brienne Chamber of Commerce and later sold to private developers. It has been used by various groups for sport aviation, sky diving and soaring. In addition, an aviation museum has been established in the old USAF hangars.

=== Emergency airfields ===
An additional 10 airfields were developed by the French government mostly from World War II USAAF Ninth Air Force Advanced Landing Grounds (ALG) as unmanned 'bare bones' airfields, consisting of a runway with minimal facilities intended for use by all NATO air forces to disperse their aircraft in case of war. They were:

- Cambrai - Épinoy Air Base (ALG A-75/B-72) 50°13′11″N 003°09′17″E (BA 126 Cambrai-Épinoy)
- Cambrai-Niergnies Air Base (ALG A-74) 50°08′08″N 003°15′53″E
- Saint Simon-Clastres Air Base (ALG A-71) 49°45′25.61″N 003°12′43.71″E
- Laon-Athies Air Base (ALG A-69) 49°35′47″N 003°42′31″E
- Saint Nazaire-Montoir Air Base 47°18′43″N 002°09′01″W
- Beauvais-Tillé Air Base* (ALG A-61) 49°27′16″N 002°06′46″E
- Saint Quentin-Estres Air Base (ALG A-72) 49°52′11″N 003°01′43″E
- Nancy-Ochey Air Base (ALG A-96) 48°34′59.75″N 005°57′15.67″E (BA 133 Nancy-Ochey)
- Metz-Frescaty Air Base (ALG Y-34) 49°04′24″N 006°07′58″E (BA 128 Metz-Frescaty)
- Épinal-Mirecourt Air Base 48°19′29″N 006°04′01″E

.* Note: NATO construction never performed.

== See also ==
- RAAF Bare Bases
- Bas 60
- Bas 90
