= Aigny =

- Commune
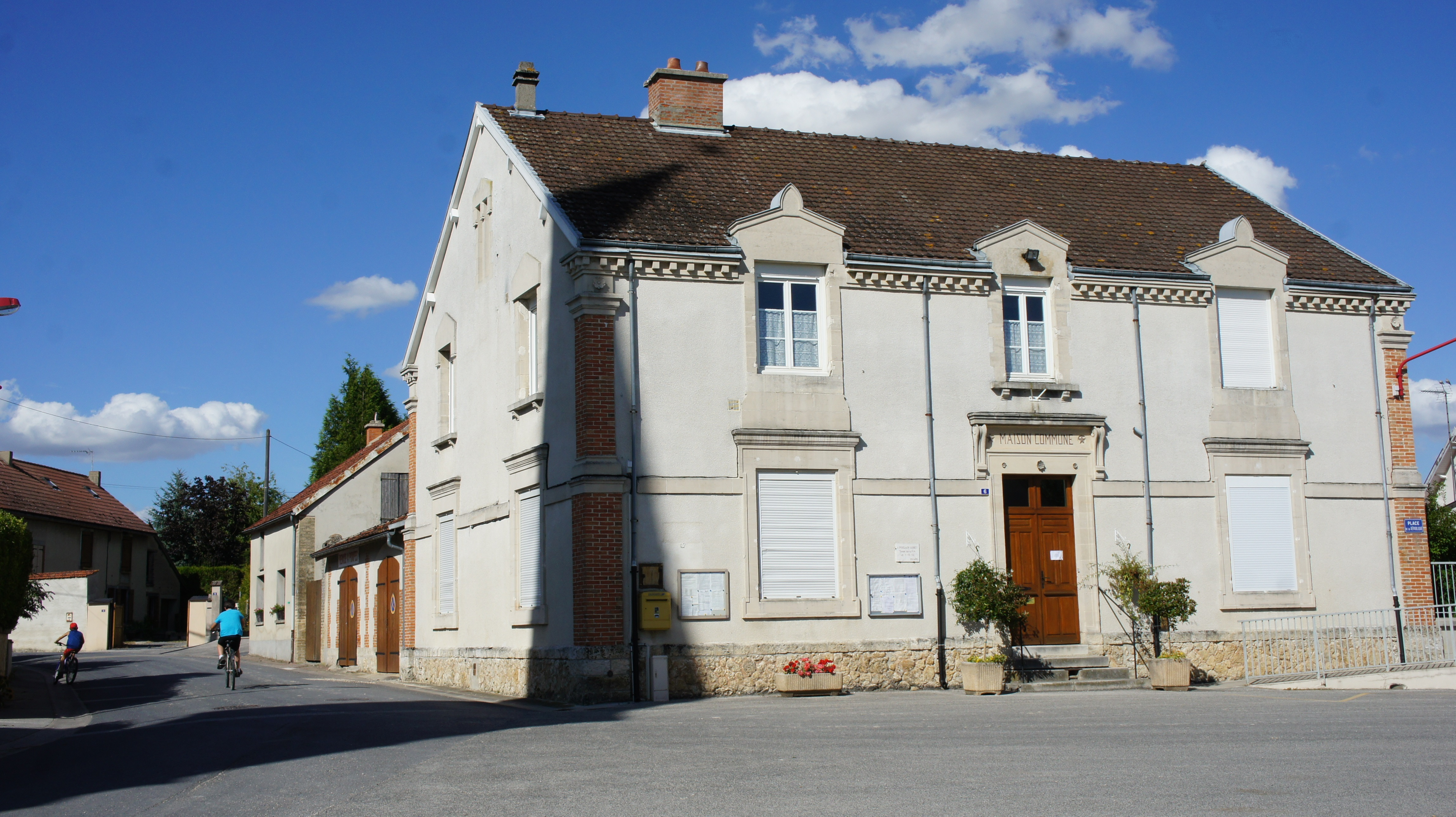
- The town hall in Aigny

- Coat of arms
- Location of Aigny
- Location within France Location within Grand Est
- Coordinates: 49°02′10″N 4°12′32″E
- Country: France
- Region: Grand Est
- Department: Marne
- Arrondissement: Châlons-en-Champagne
- Canton: Châlons-en-Champagne-2
- Intercommunality: Châlons-en-Champagne

Government
  - Mayor (2020–2026): Henri Jesson
- Area^{1}: 11.24 km^{2} (4.34 sq mi)
- Elevation: 77 m (253 ft)
- Population (2023): 289
  - Density: 25.7/km^{2} (66.6/sq mi)
- Time zone: UTC+01:00 (CET)
  - Summer (DST): UTC+02:00 (CEST)
- INSEE/Postal code: 51003 /51150
- ^{1} French Land Register data, which excludes lakes, ponds, glaciers > 1 km^{2} (0.386 sq mi or 247 acres) and river estuaries.

Aigny (French pronunciation: [ɛɲi]) is a commune in the Marne department in northeastern France.

== Population ==
Historical population
| Year | Pop. | ±% p.a. |
|---|---|---|
| 1968 | 207 | — |
| 1975 | 211 | +0.27% |
| 1982 | 218 | +0.47% |
| 1990 | 192 | −1.57% |
| 1999 | 189 | −0.17% |
| 2007 | 222 | +2.03% |
| 2012 | 253 | +2.65% |
| 2017 | 275 | +1.68% |
| 2023 | 289 | +0.83% |
Source: INSEE

== See also ==
- Communes of the Marne department
