= La Veuve =

- Commune
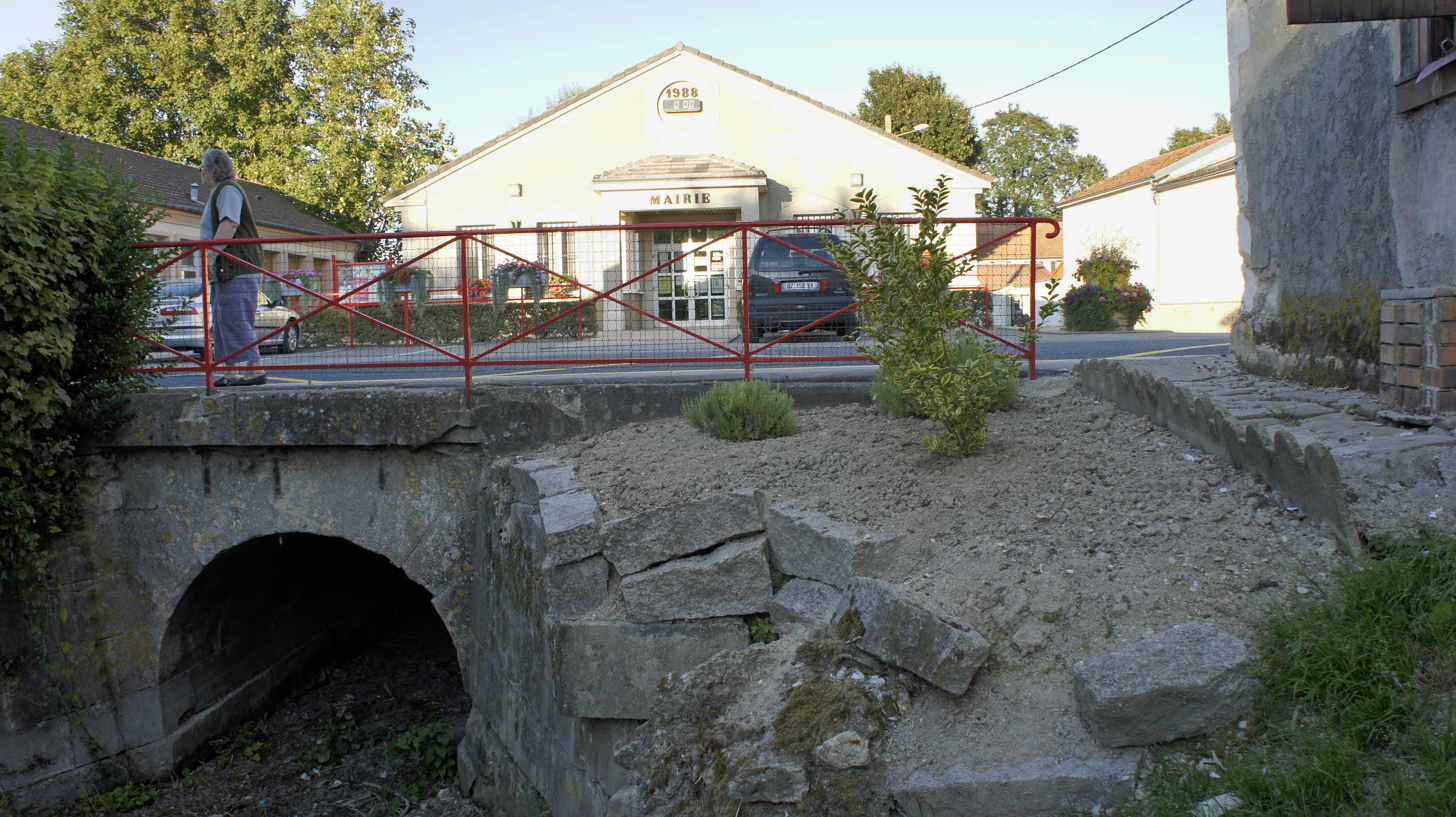
- The town hall in La Veuve

- Coat of arms
- Location of La Veuve
- Location within France Location within Grand Est
- Coordinates: 49°01′54″N 4°19′06″E
- Country: France
- Region: Grand Est
- Department: Marne
- Arrondissement: Châlons-en-Champagne
- Canton: Châlons-en-Champagne-2
- Intercommunality: CA Châlons-en-Champagne

Government
  - Mayor (2020–2026): Gérard Galichet
- Area^{1}: 24.41 km^{2} (9.42 sq mi)
- Population (2023): 602
  - Density: 24.7/km^{2} (63.9/sq mi)
- Time zone: UTC+01:00 (CET)
  - Summer (DST): UTC+02:00 (CEST)
- INSEE/Postal code: 51617 /51520
- Website: https://www.mairie-laveuve.com
- ^{1} French Land Register data, which excludes lakes, ponds, glaciers > 1 km^{2} (0.386 sq mi or 247 acres) and river estuaries.

La Veuve (French pronunciation: [la vœv]) is a commune in the Marne department in the Grand Est region in north-eastern France.

== See also ==
- Communes of the Marne department
