= Vatry Air Base =

- IATA: XCR; ICAO: LFOK

Summary
- Airport type: Military
- Location: Chalons, France
- Elevation AMSL: 587 ft (179 m)
- Coordinates: 48°46′37″N 004°11′44″E

Map
- Location of Vatry Air Base

Runways
Direction	Length		Surface
Direction	ft	m	Surface
10/28	12,664	3,860	Concrete
- worldaerodata.com Vatry

Vatry Air Base (IATA: XCR, ICAO: LFOK) was a United States Air Force base in France. After its closure, it was redeveloped into Chalons-Vatry Airport, primarily used for international air cargo transport.

== History ==
Vatry Airport's origins begin in 1950 when, with the Cold War, NATO faced several problems when attempting to solve the air power survival equation. Planning for first strike survival in both conventional and nuclear wars had to be considered.

The primary operating bases for NATO air forces were built on small parcels of land with very limited dispersal space. It was decided to build dispersal bases away from the primary bases to be used in the event of an emergency. Vatry was selected to be one of these "NATO Dispersed Operating Bases".

No flying unit was ever permanently assigned to Vatry and it was used for dispersal training only. However, it did require the same level of equipment as a standard air base. NATO security personnel were required to control base access, guard equipment, munitions and supplies stored on the facility, as well as prevent vandalism.

Construction began in 1953, and Vatry Air Base was designed for 50 fighters with three large hangars constructed. In 1956 construction was completed and Det #2, 48th Air Base Group from Chaumont-Semoutiers Air Base was designated as the host unit. Aircraft from the United States Air Force 21st, 48th, 49th and 388th Fighter-Bomber Wings deployed to Vatry, usually one fighter squadron at a time.

In 1959 Vatry Air Base was phased down and all munitions, equipment and supplies were sent to Chaumont Air Base's Base Supply and the host detachment was inactivated. The facility was transferred to the United States Army as a training facility in 1960. With the French withdrawal from the integrated NATO military structure in 1967, the American forces left Vatry Air Base and it was closed.

For many years, Vatry Air Base was under the control of the French Air Force and used for a training facility. About 2000 it was sold to civil interests and today is being used as an international heavy cargo airport.
