= Saint-Simon – Clastres Air Base =

Airfield in France

Saint-Simon - Clastres Air Base Base aérienne de Saint-Simon - Clastres Advanced Landing Ground (ALG) A-71
- Saint-Simon / Clastres, France
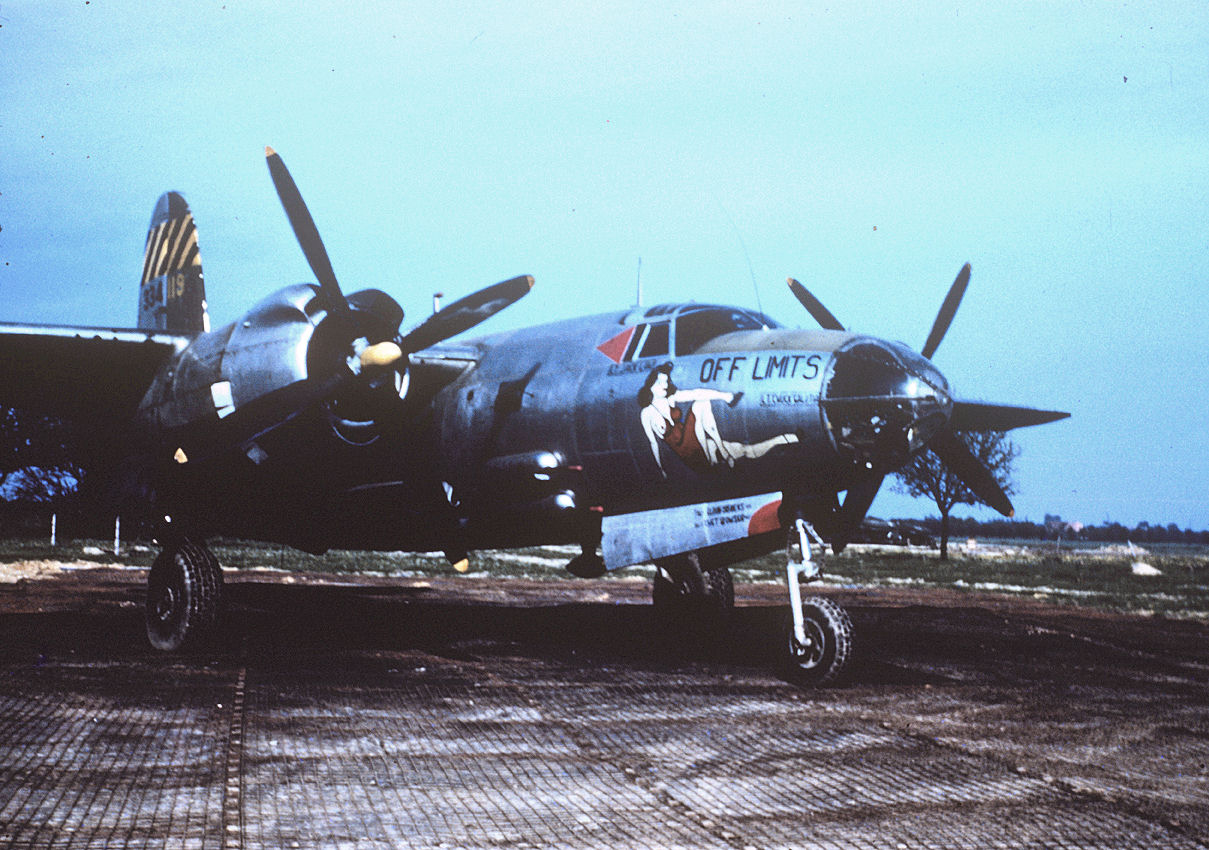
- The nose art of a B-26 Marauder (FW-T, serial number 43-34119) nicknamed "Off Limits" of the 387th Bomb Group at Saint-Simon - Clastres Air Base (ALG A-71)

Site information
- Type: Military airfield
- Controlled by: United States Army Air Forces; United States Air Force

Location
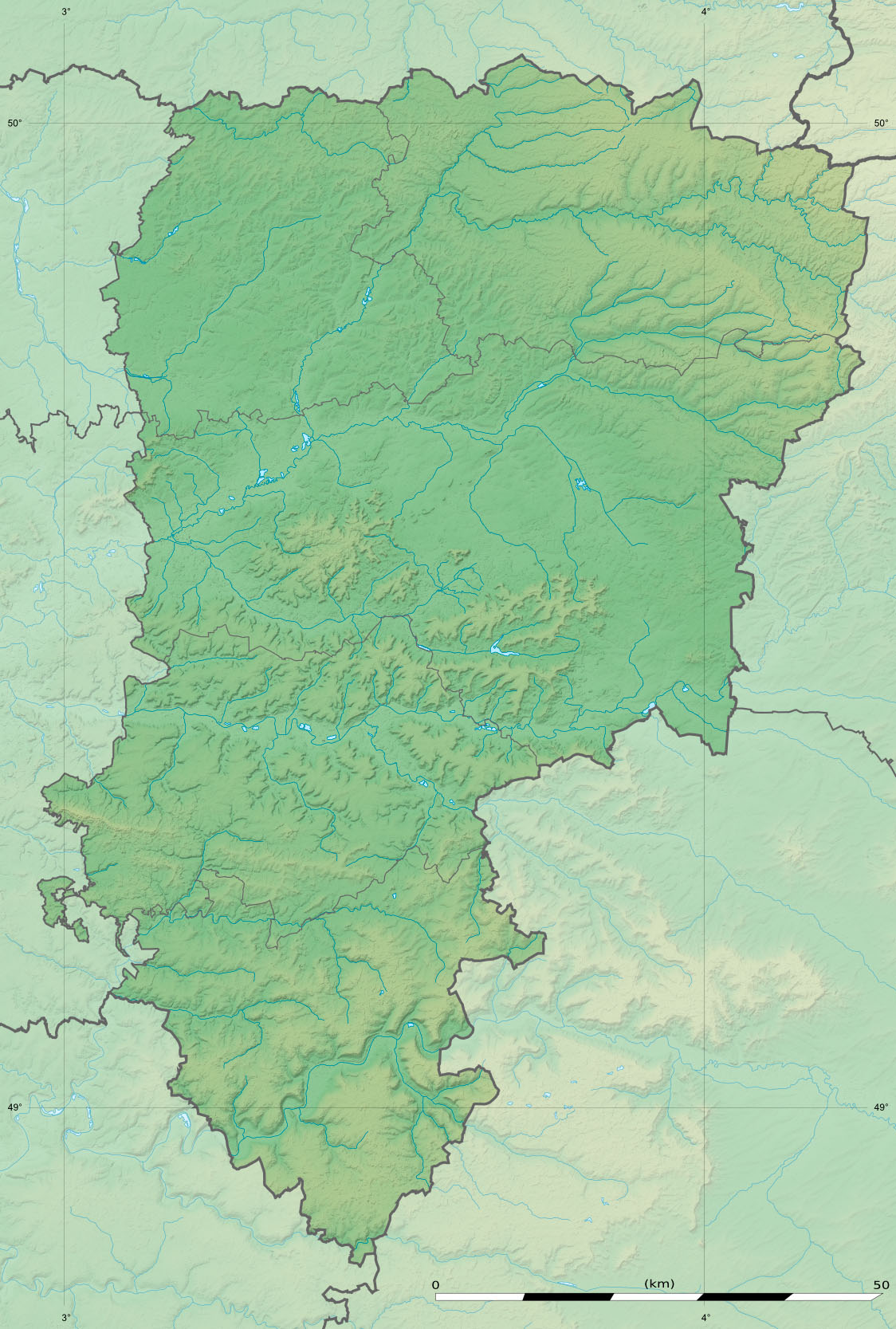
- Location in Aisne, France Saint-Simon – Clastres Air Base (France)
- Coordinates: 49°45′26″N 003°12′44″E

Site history
- In use: 1940-May 1945. 1950s-1960s
- Materials: Concrete

Saint-Simon – Clastres Air Base (French: Base aérienne de Saint-Simon - Clastres) (ICAO: LFYT) is an abandoned military airfield, which is located approximately 3 km (2 NM) northwest of Clastres and east of Saint-Simon, both communes in the Aisne department of the Picardy (Picardie) region in France. It is approximately 116 km (63 NM) north-northeast of Paris.

Its history begins before World War II when it was originally a grass civil airdrome. During the German occupation of France (1940–1944), the Luftwaffe developed the airdrome into a major military airfield. Attacked frequently by Allied Air Forces, the Luftwaffe base was seized by Allied Ground Forces in September 1944 and was used as a Fighter and bomber base by the United States Army Air Force until the end of the war. It was redeveloped in the 1950s as a NATO Dispersed Operating Base and was closed in 1967.

Today, it is mostly agricultural fields, and also a power-generating wind farm, with several electric generating windmills.

== History ==
Clastres Airport was a pre-World War II civil airport, consisting of a terminal, hangar, some support buildings and a grass airfield, serving the nearby city of Saint-Quentin.

=== German use during World War II ===
It was seized by the Germans in June 1940 during the early part of the Battle of France. It was briefly used as a fighter airfield by Jagdgeschwader 27 (JG 27) and Jagdgeschwader 52 (JG 52) in early June 1940, participating in the Blitzkrieg against the French Army and British Expeditionary Force flying Messerschmitt Bf 109Es.

Clastres was unused during the balance of 1940 and 1941 and 1942. In 1943, the Germans laid down two 1800m all-weather concrete runways at the airport, aligned 05/23 and 10/29. Presumably, this was due to the fortification of the Pas-de-Calais, being believed by the Germans that when the Americans and British tried to land in France to open a Second Front, the airfield would have a key role in the defense of France.

In early February 1944, Clastres became a day interceptor airfield that housed fighters to attack the USAAF Eighth Air Force heavy bomber fleets attacking targets in Occupied Europe and Germany. Known units assigned (all from Luftlotte 3, Fliegerkorps IV):

- Schlachtgeschwader 4 (SG 4) February-6 June 1944 Focke-Wulf Fw 190F/G
- Jagdgeschwader 1 (JG 1) 6 June-28 August 1944 Focke-Wulf Fw 190A

The Fw 190F/G were derivatives of the Fw 190A, however, had been configured to have a dive-bombing capability. However, in the interceptor role, they were faster and had longer range than the Fw 190A. Previously not attacked by Allied bombers, Clastres came under frequent attack by Ninth Air Force Martin B-26 Marauder medium bombers and Republic P-47 Thunderbolts mostly with 500-pound General-Purpose bombs; unguided rockets and .50 caliber machine gun sweeps when Eighth Air Force heavy bombers (Boeing B-17 Flying Fortresses, Consolidated B-24 Liberators) were within interception range of the Luftwaffe aircraft assigned to the base. The attacks were timed to have the maximum effect possible to keep the interceptors pinned down on the ground and be unable to attack the heavy bombers. Also the P-51 Mustang fighter-escort groups of Eighth Air Force would drop down on their return to England and attack the base with a fighter sweep and attack any target of opportunity to be found at the airfield.

Also, as part of Operation Quicksilver, which was designed to deceive the Germans about where the invasion of France would take place, Clastres was attacked by Eighth Air Force Boeing B-17 Flying Fortress heavy bomber groups in early June 1944, just prior to the D-Day landings in Normandy.

=== American use ===
American Ninth Army units moved through the area in early September 1944, heading towards Saint-Quentin. On 7 September, the IX Engineer Command 846th Engineer Aviation Battalion moved in and began a quick rehabilitation of the base so it could be used by American aircraft. It was declared operationally ready for Ninth Air Force combat units on 9 September, only a few days after its capture from German forces, being designated as Advanced Landing Ground "A-71 Clastres Airfield".

In addition to the airfield, tents were used for billeting and also for support facilities; an access road was built to the existing road infrastructure; a dump for supplies, ammunition, and gasoline drums, along with a drinkable water and minimal electrical grid for communications and station lighting. It hosted the following known units:

- 387th Bombardment Group, 30 October 1944 – 29 April 1945, Martin B-26 Marauder
- 367th Fighter Group, 8 September 1944 – 28 October 1944, Lockheed P-38 Lightning

When the combat units moved out, Clastres was turned over to Air Technical Service Command, becoming an Air Depot and later, during the summer of 1945, a storage depot for large numbers of surplus aircraft, whose units had returned to the United States via ship.

Clastres Air Base was turned over to the French Air Ministry on 30 November 1945.

=== Postwar use ===
In French control after the war, the airport sat abandoned for several years. There was much unexploded ordnance at the site which needed to be removed, as well as the wreckage of German and American aircraft. Many of the buildings at the base were destroyed by the war, and although some had been repaired by the American combat engineers, most were in ruins. There was no use for the prewar airport, and as a result, the Air Ministry leased the land, concrete runways, structures and all, out to farmers for agricultural use, sending in unexploded ordnance teams to remove the dangerous munitions.

=== NATO use ===
In 1950 when as a result of the Cold War threat of the Soviet Union, the air base at Clastres was offered to the United States Air Force by the French Air Ministry as part of their NATO commitment to establish a modern Air Force Base at the site. NATO faced several problems when attempting to solve the air power survival equation. Planning for a Warsaw Pact first strike survival in both conventional and nuclear wars had to be considered. The main air bases were built on small parcels of land with very limited dispersal space. It was decided to use Clastres as a NATO Dispersed Operating Base, be used in the event of an emergency. The goal was to have no more than one fighter squadron on each main or dispersed base in the event of war.

Beginning in 1953, the wartime wreckage was finally cleared from the base and construction was begun. French Army Explosive demolition teams were brought in to safely remove unexploded ordnance remaining from the war and the site was prepared for construction. A modern all-weather concrete NATO jet runway was laid down aligned 02/20, with taxiways and dispersal areas for three fighter squadrons. The dispersals were designed in a circular marguerite system of hardstands which could be revetted later with earth for added aircraft protection. Typically the margueriete consisted of fifteen to eighteen hardstands, with each hardstand capable of parking one or two aircraft, allowing the planes to be spaced approximately 150 feet (50 m) apart. Each squadron was assigned to a separate margueriete, with space for about 50 fighters.

Other than the occasional touch-and-go landing of NATO (USAF) aircraft, Saint-Simon – Clastres Air Base was never used. With the French withdrawal from the integrated military component of NATO in 1967, the base was abandoned.

== Current use ==
In the 40 years since its closure, the base has been primarily used for agriculture. The NATO concrete runway, taxiways and marguerites remain, all in reasonable condition A windmill farm has been constructed on the north end of the airfield, along with what appear to be two or three race cart tracks inside the grassy areas of the northern marguerites. In recent years, a coating over the concrete appears to have been laid down on the main runway and taxiway, between the dispersal areas; these perhaps may be used for light aircraft, probably agricultural.

The only visible remaining feature of the wartime airfield is a section of the 10/29 east–west runway. The concrete is deteriorated with large breaks in the expansion joints visible, however part of the runway has also been resurfaced to the east side of the NATO runway, and a small metal structure, probably used for agriculture has been erected on the 29 end by a local access road from the village of Clastres, just to the southeast of the airfield.

== See also ==
- Advanced Landing Ground
