= Recy =

- Commune
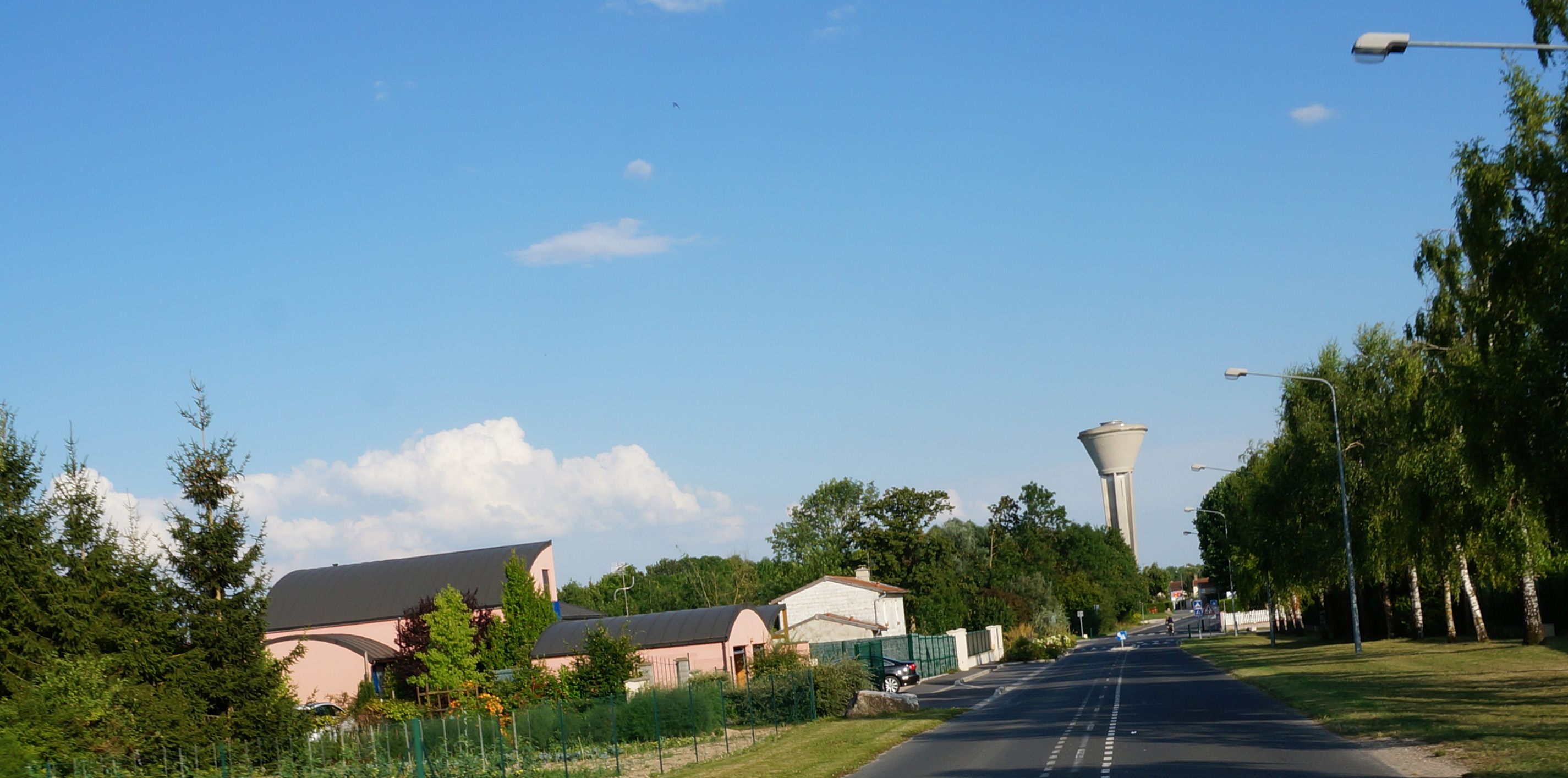
- The road into Recy
- Location of Recy
- Location within France Location within Grand Est
- Coordinates: 48°59′N 4°19′E
- Country: France
- Region: Grand Est
- Department: Marne
- Arrondissement: Châlons-en-Champagne
- Canton: Châlons-en-Champagne-2
- Intercommunality: CA Châlons-en-Champagne

Government
  - Mayor (2020–2026): Carole Saguet Simon
- Area^{1}: 14.38 km^{2} (5.55 sq mi)
- Elevation: 82 m (269 ft)
- Population (2023): 1,093
  - Density: 76.01/km^{2} (196.9/sq mi)
- Time zone: UTC+01:00 (CET)
  - Summer (DST): UTC+02:00 (CEST)
- INSEE/Postal code: 51453 /51520
- ^{1} French Land Register data, which excludes lakes, ponds, glaciers > 1 km^{2} (0.386 sq mi or 247 acres) and river estuaries.

Recy (French pronunciation: [ʁəsi]) is a commune in the Marne department in north-eastern France.

== See also ==
- Communes of the Marne department

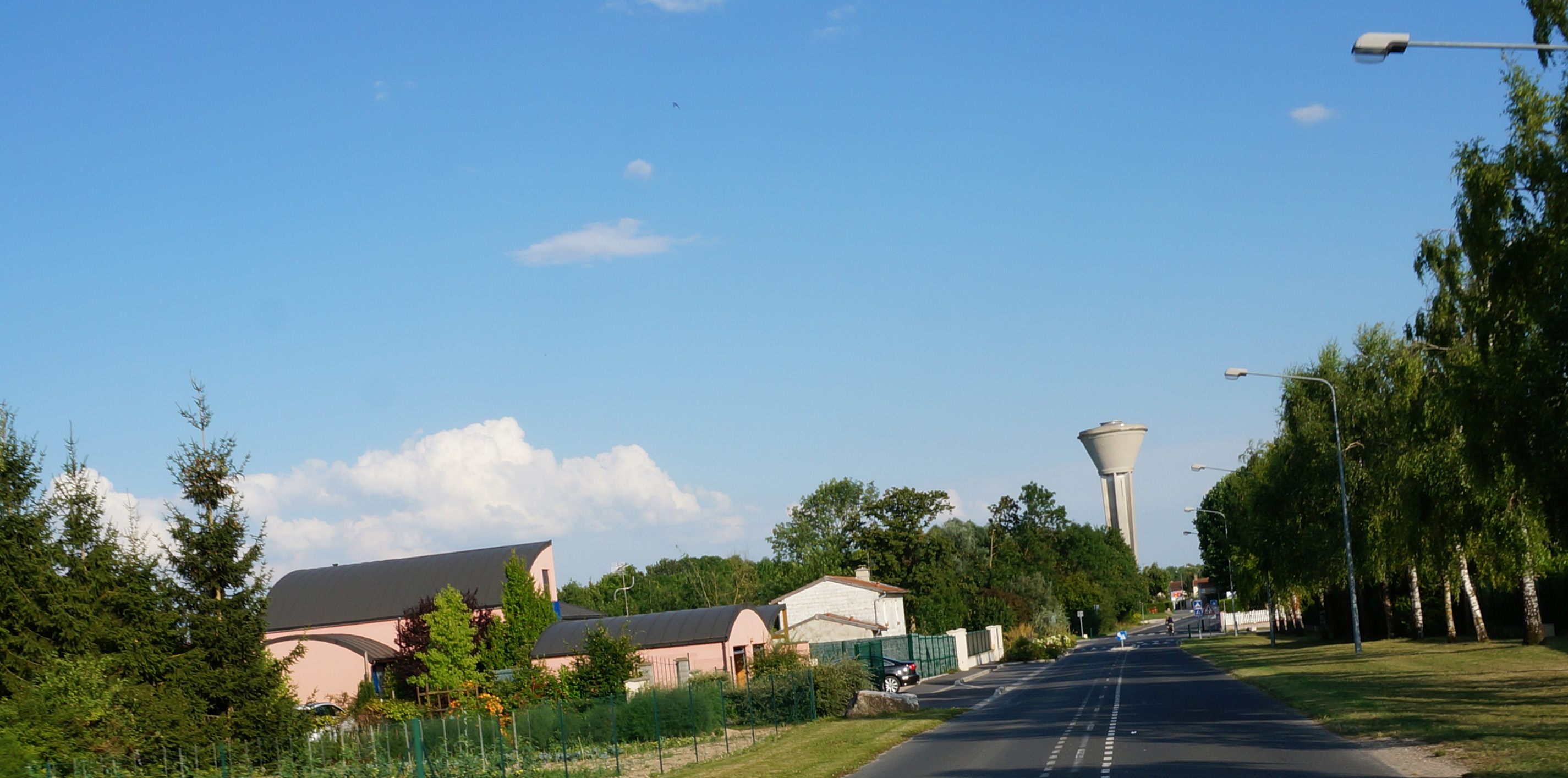
