= Saint-Pierre, Marne =

Saint-Pierre
- Commune
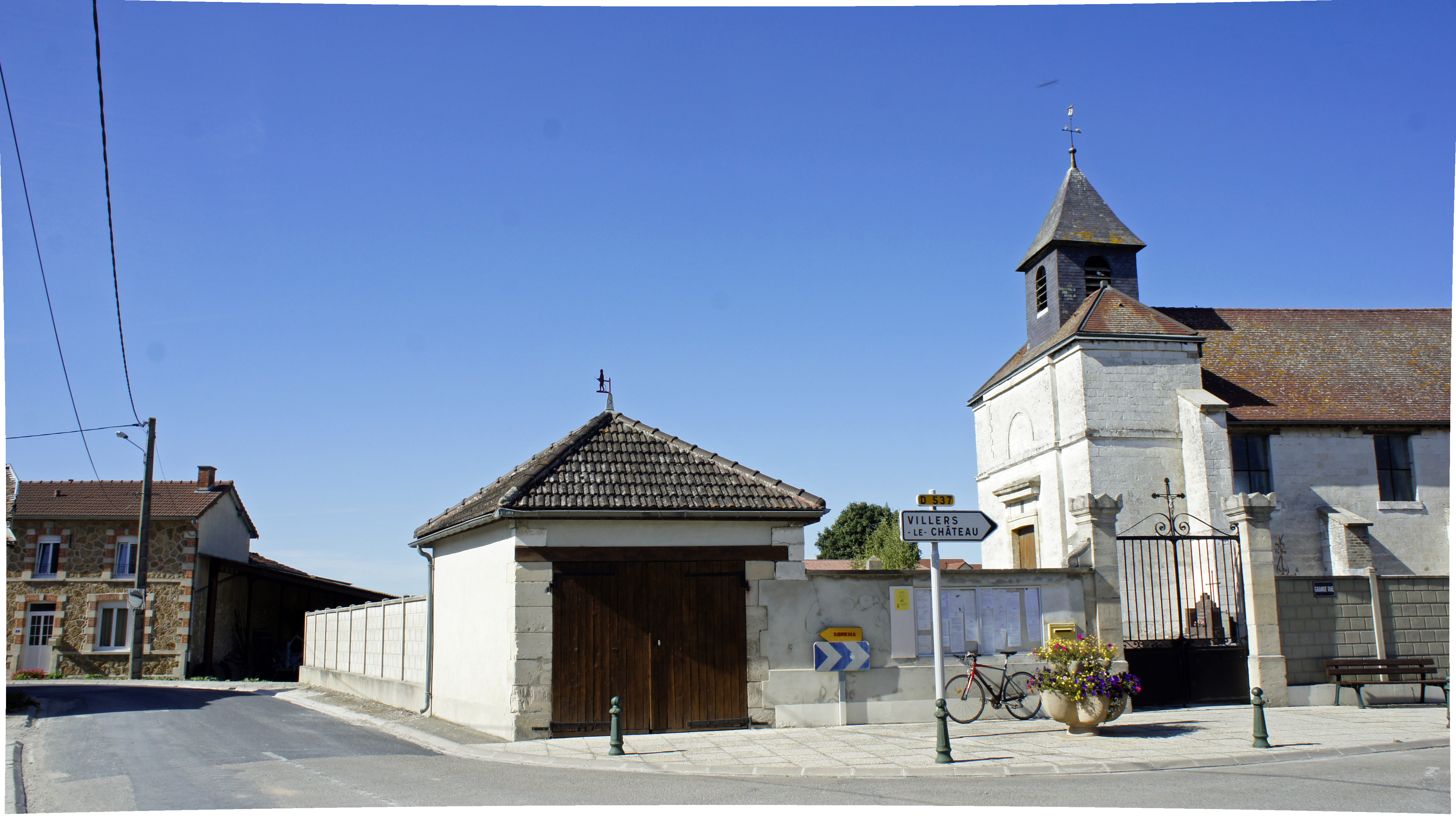
- The church and fire station in Saint-Pierre
- Location of Saint-Pierre
- Location within France Location within Grand Est
- Coordinates: 48°56′51″N 4°14′41″E
- Country: France
- Region: Grand Est
- Department: Marne
- Arrondissement: Châlons-en-Champagne
- Canton: Châlons-en-Champagne-2
- Intercommunality: CA Châlons-en-Champagne

Government
  - Mayor (2020–2026): Yves Perrein
- Area^{1}: 10.27 km^{2} (3.97 sq mi)
- Elevation: 90 m (300 ft)
- Population (2023): 293
  - Density: 28.5/km^{2} (73.9/sq mi)
- Time zone: UTC+01:00 (CET)
  - Summer (DST): UTC+02:00 (CEST)
- INSEE/Postal code: 51509 /51510
- ^{1} French Land Register data, which excludes lakes, ponds, glaciers > 1 km^{2} (0.386 sq mi or 247 acres) and river estuaries.

Saint-Pierre (French pronunciation: [sɛ̃ pjɛʁ]) is a commune in the Marne department in north-eastern France.

== See also ==
- Communes of the Marne department
