= Saint-Martin-sur-le-Pré =

- Commune
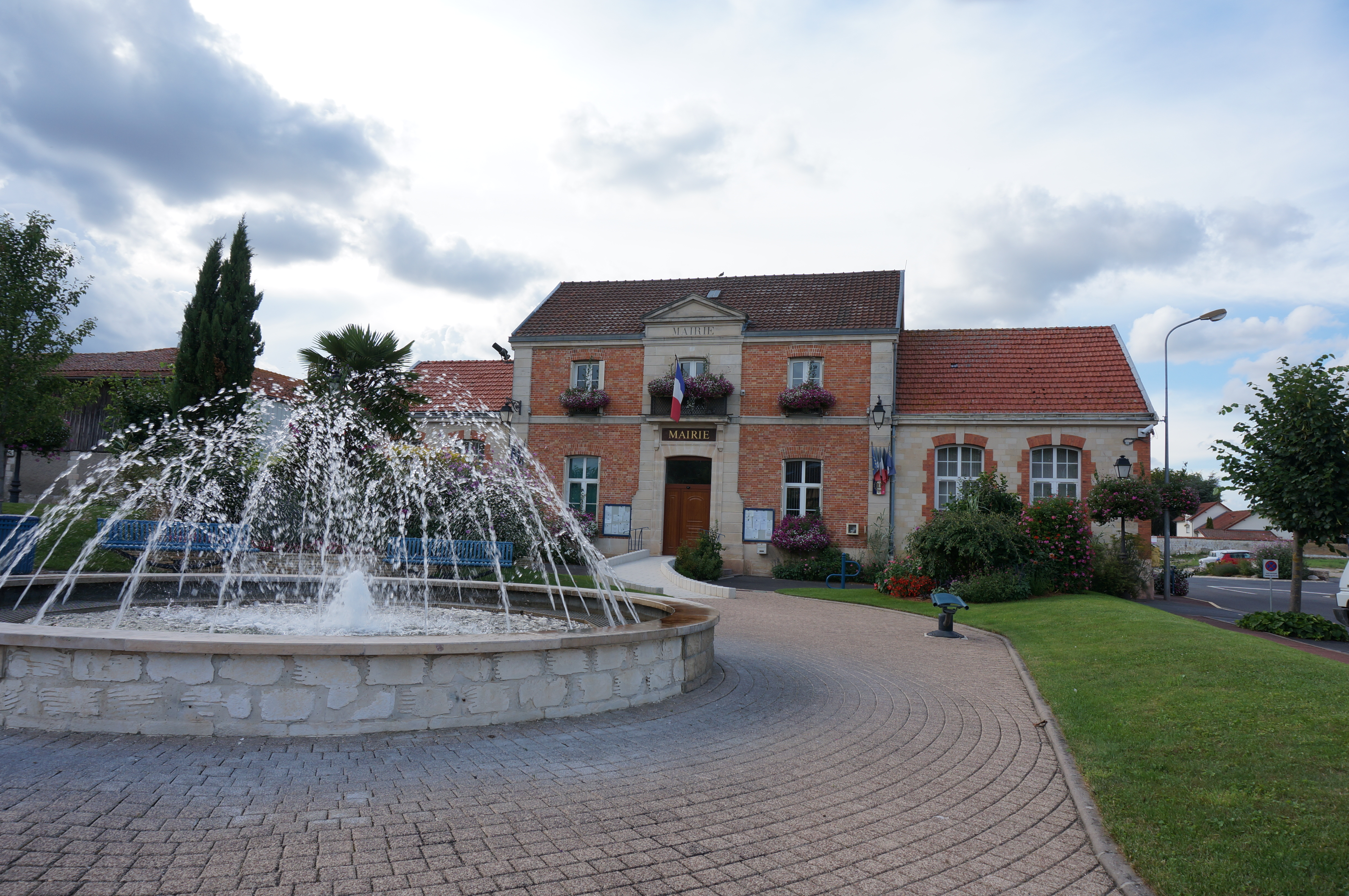
- The town hall in Saint-Martin-sur-le-Pré

- Coat of arms
- Location of Saint-Martin-sur-le-Pré
- Location within France Location within Grand Est
- Coordinates: 48°58′40″N 4°20′22″E
- Country: France
- Region: Grand Est
- Department: Marne
- Arrondissement: Châlons-en-Champagne
- Canton: Châlons-en-Champagne-2
- Intercommunality: CA Châlons-en-Champagne

Government
  - Mayor (2020–2026): Jacques Jesson
- Area^{1}: 11.89 km^{2} (4.59 sq mi)
- Elevation: 87 m (285 ft)
- Population (2023): 792
  - Density: 66.6/km^{2} (173/sq mi)
- Time zone: UTC+01:00 (CET)
  - Summer (DST): UTC+02:00 (CEST)
- INSEE/Postal code: 51504 /51520
- ^{1} French Land Register data, which excludes lakes, ponds, glaciers > 1 km^{2} (0.386 sq mi or 247 acres) and river estuaries.

Saint-Martin-sur-le-Pré (French pronunciation: [sɛ̃ maʁtɛ̃ syʁ lə pʁe]) is a commune in the Marne department in north-eastern France.

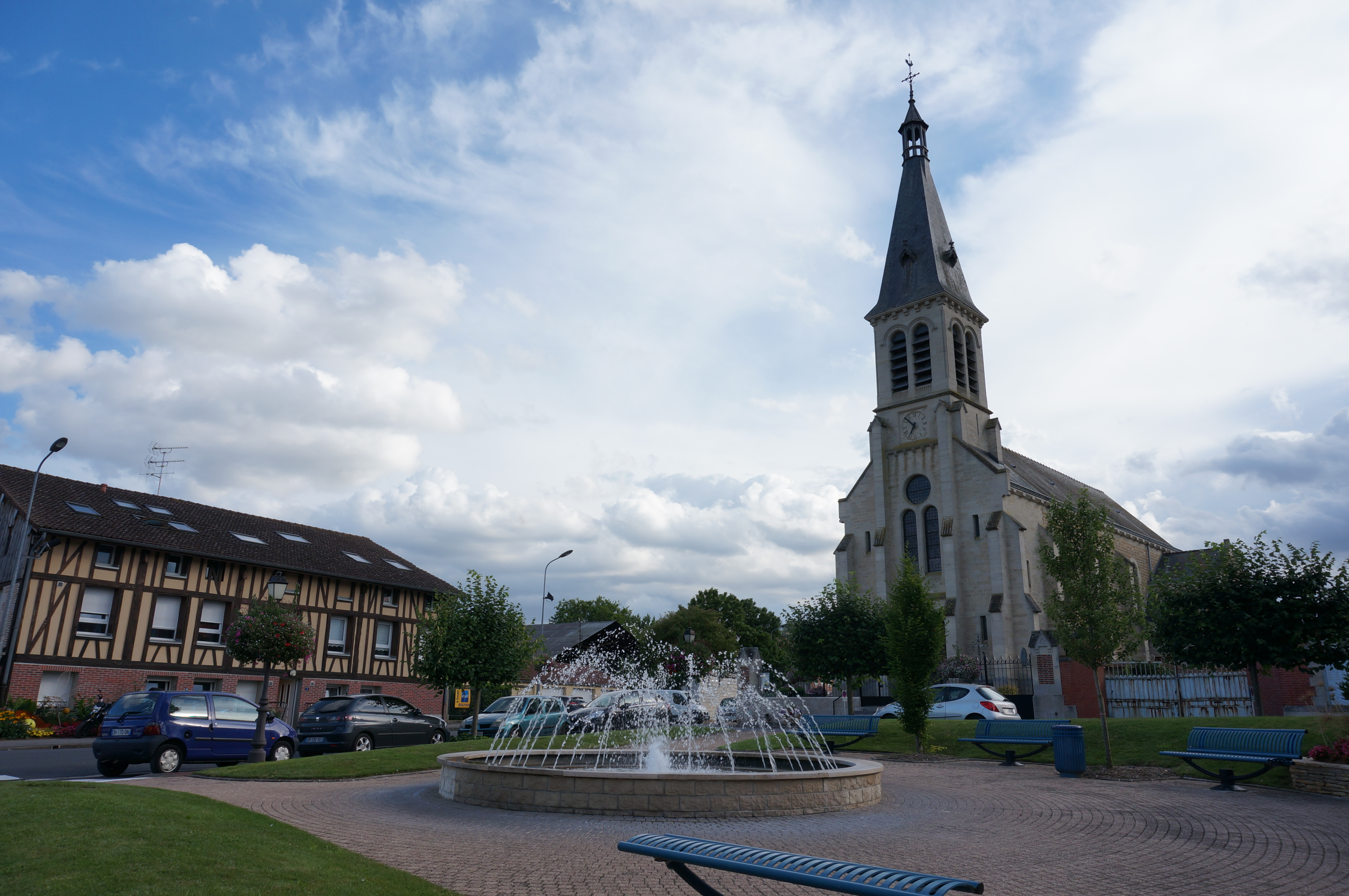

== See also ==
- Communes of the Marne department
