= Champigneul-Champagne =

- Commune
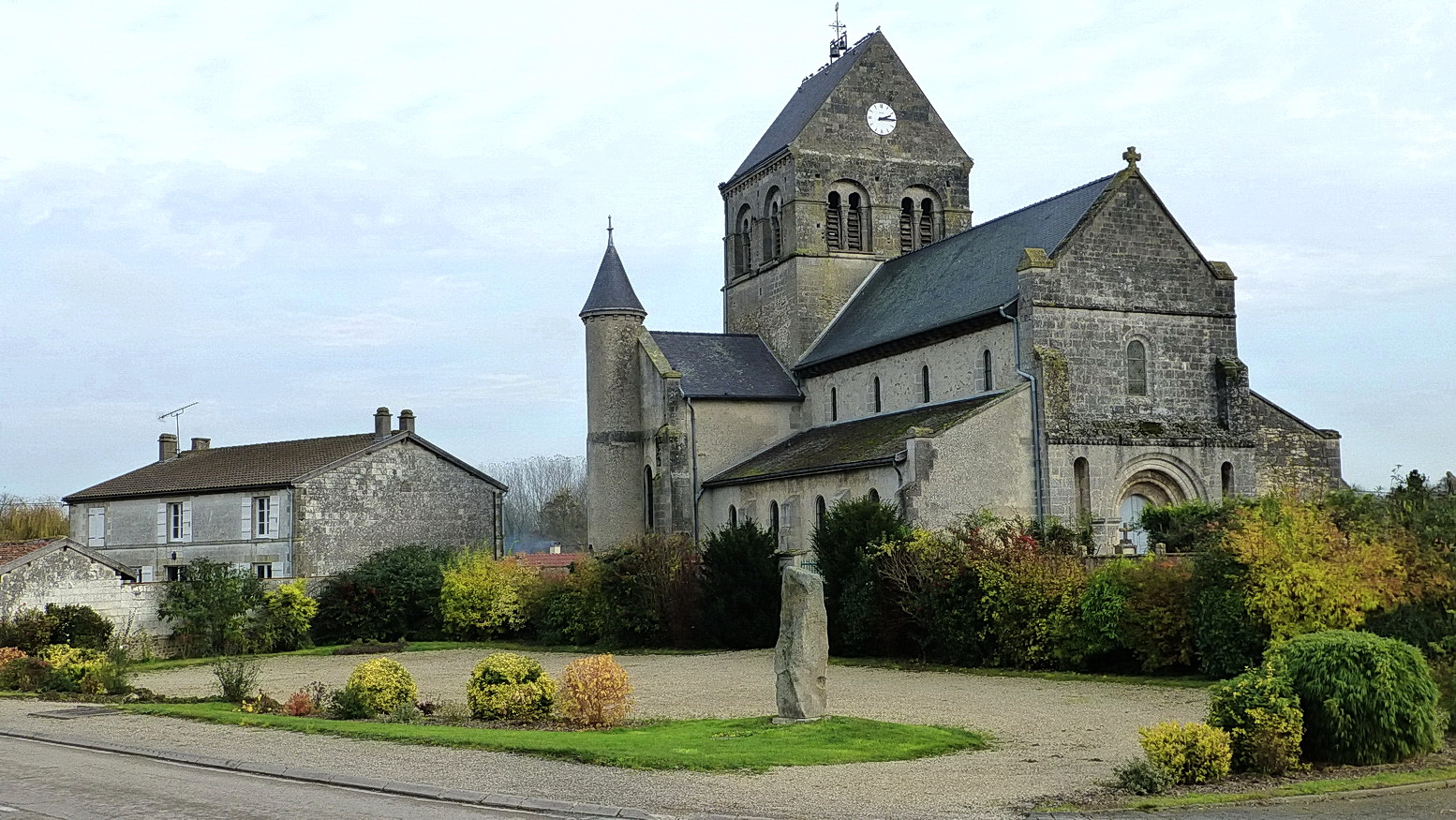
- The church and menhir in Champigneul-Champagne
- Location of Champigneul-Champagne
- Location within France Location within Grand Est
- Coordinates: 48°58′22″N 4°10′07″E
- Country: France
- Region: Grand Est
- Department: Marne
- Arrondissement: Châlons-en-Champagne
- Canton: Châlons-en-Champagne-2
- Intercommunality: CA Châlons-en-Champagne

Government
  - Mayor (2020–2026): Marcel Leherle
- Area^{1}: 29.66 km^{2} (11.45 sq mi)
- Elevation: 80 m (260 ft)
- Population (2023): 322
  - Density: 10.9/km^{2} (28.1/sq mi)
- Time zone: UTC+01:00 (CET)
  - Summer (DST): UTC+02:00 (CEST)
- INSEE/Postal code: 51117 /51150
- ^{1} French Land Register data, which excludes lakes, ponds, glaciers > 1 km^{2} (0.386 sq mi or 247 acres) and river estuaries.

Champigneul-Champagne (French pronunciation: [ʃɑ̃piɲœl ʃɑ̃paɲ]) is a commune in the Marne department in north-eastern France.

== See also ==
- Communes of the Marne department
