= Juvigny, Marne =

Juvigny
- Commune
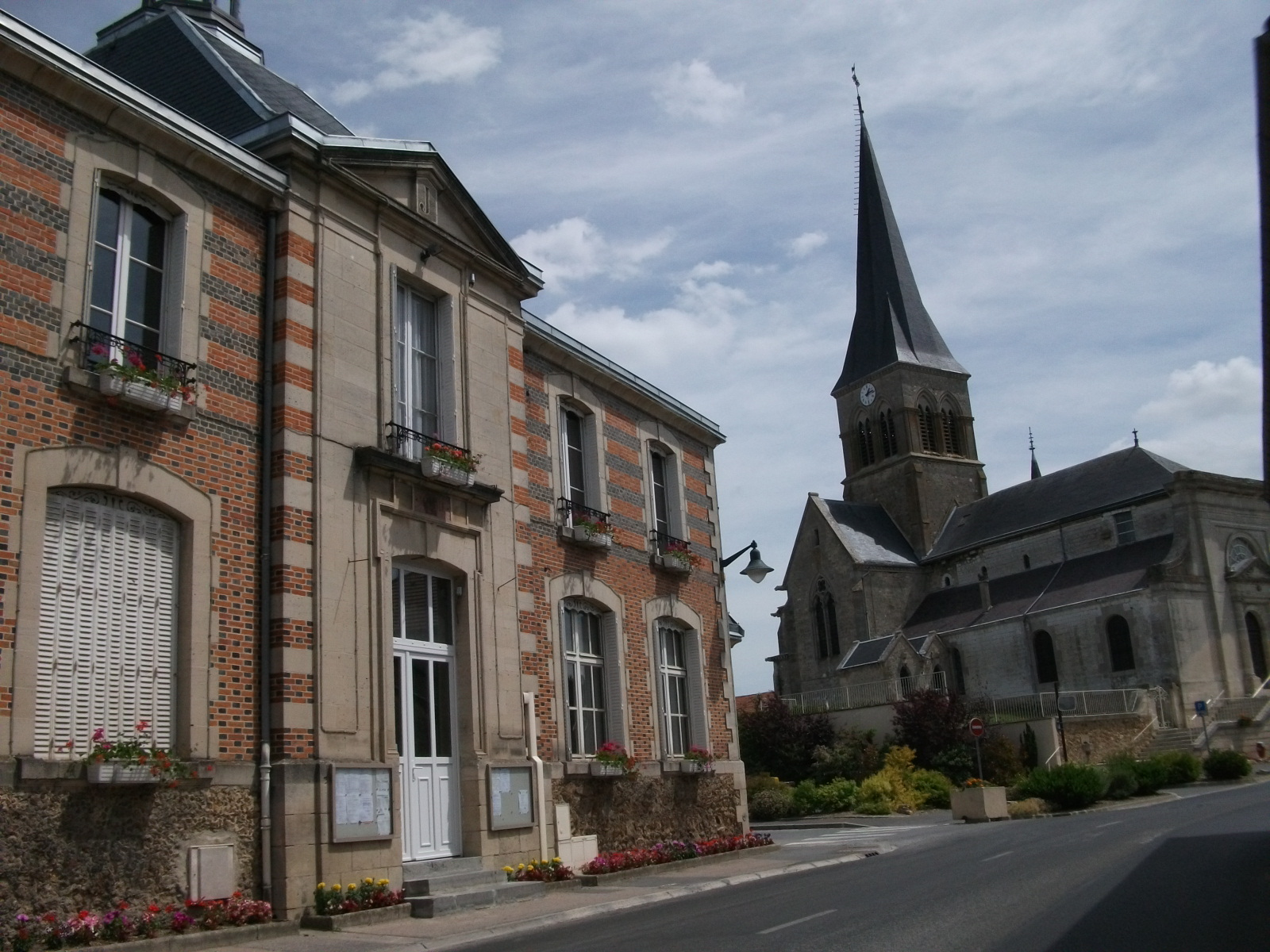
- The church and town hall in Juvigny

- Coat of arms
- Location of Juvigny
- Location within France Location within Grand Est
- Coordinates: 49°01′14″N 4°15′50″E
- Country: France
- Region: Grand Est
- Department: Marne
- Arrondissement: Châlons-en-Champagne
- Canton: Châlons-en-Champagne-2
- Intercommunality: CA Châlons-en-Champagne

Government
  - Mayor (2020–2026): Fabrice Regnault
- Area^{1}: 21.37 km^{2} (8.25 sq mi)
- Elevation: 84 m (276 ft)
- Population (2023): 936
  - Density: 43.8/km^{2} (113/sq mi)
- Time zone: UTC+01:00 (CET)
  - Summer (DST): UTC+02:00 (CEST)
- INSEE/Postal code: 51312 /51150
- ^{1} French Land Register data, which excludes lakes, ponds, glaciers > 1 km^{2} (0.386 sq mi or 247 acres) and river estuaries.

Juvigny (French pronunciation: [ʒyviɲi]) is a commune in the Marne department in north-eastern France.

== See also ==
- Communes of the Marne department
