= Compertrix =

- Commune
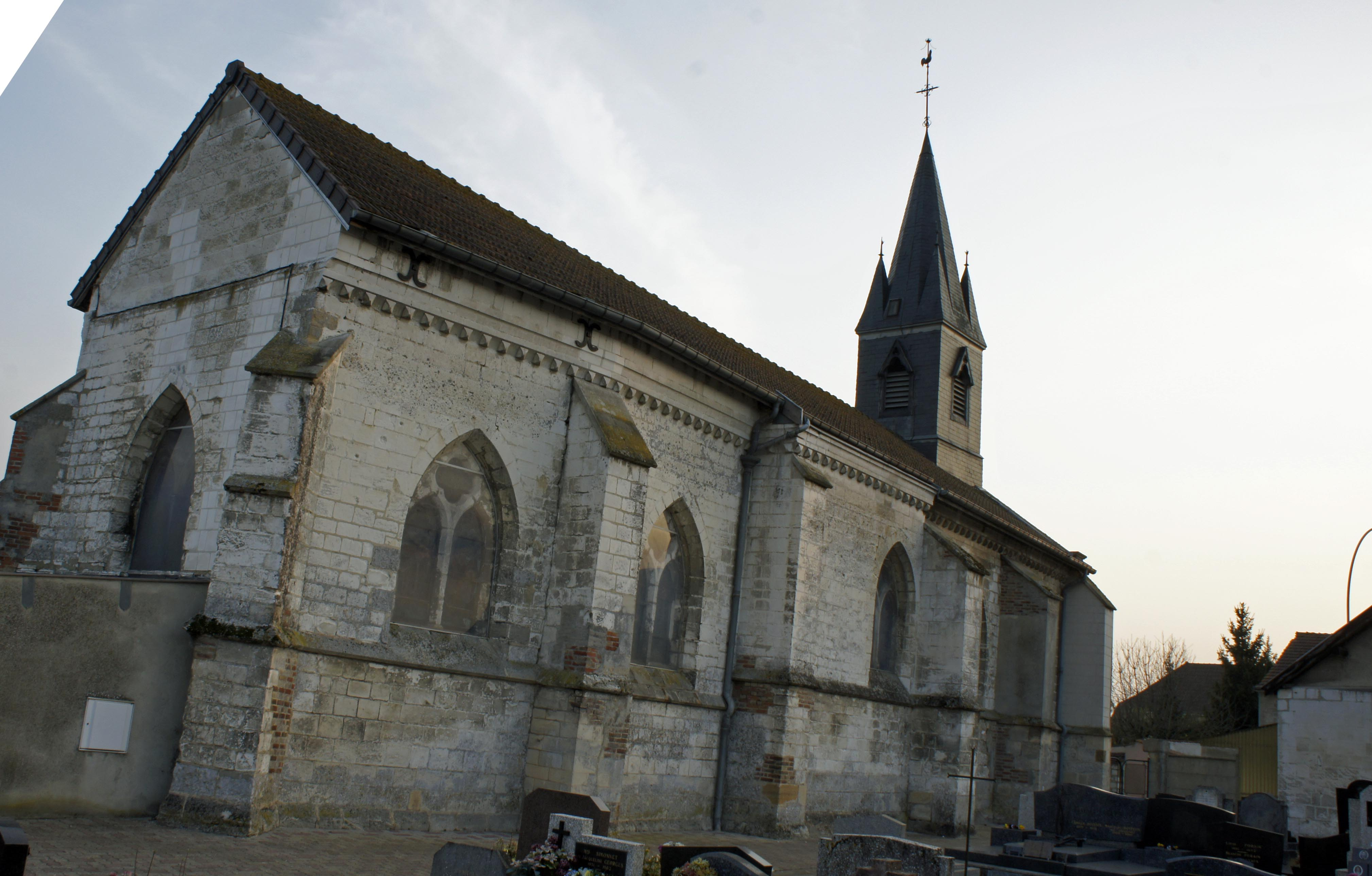
- The church in Compertrix

- Coat of arms
- Location of Compertrix
- Location within France Location within Grand Est
- Coordinates: 48°56′23″N 4°21′05″E
- Country: France
- Region: Grand Est
- Department: Marne
- Arrondissement: Châlons-en-Champagne
- Canton: Châlons-en-Champagne-1
- Intercommunality: CA Châlons-en-Champagne

Government
  - Mayor (2020–2026): Pascal Lefort
- Area^{1}: 4.76 km^{2} (1.84 sq mi)
- Elevation: 91 m (299 ft)
- Highest elevation: 129 m (423 ft)
- Lowest elevation: 81 m (266 ft)
- Population (2023): 1,308
  - Density: 275/km^{2} (712/sq mi)
- Time zone: UTC+01:00 (CET)
  - Summer (DST): UTC+02:00 (CEST)
- INSEE/Postal code: 51160 /51510
- ^{1} French Land Register data, which excludes lakes, ponds, glaciers > 1 km^{2} (0.386 sq mi or 247 acres) and river estuaries.

Compertrix (French pronunciation: [kɔ̃pɛʁtʁi]) is a commune in the Marne department in north-eastern France.

== See also ==
- Communes of the Marne department
