= Canton of Châlons-en-Champagne-2 =

Coordinates: 48.96°N 4.37°E

The canton of Châlons-en-Champagne-2 is an administrative division of the Marne department, northeastern France. Its borders were modified at the French canton reorganisation which came into effect in March 2015. Its seat is in Châlons-en-Champagne.

It consists of the following communes:

1. Aigny
2. Aulnay-sur-Marne
3. Châlons-en-Champagne (partly)
4. Champigneul-Champagne
5. Cherville
6. Condé-sur-Marne
7. Les Grandes-Loges
8. Isse
9. Jâlons
10. Juvigny
11. Matougues
12. Recy
13. Saint-Gibrien
14. Saint-Martin-sur-le-Pré
15. Saint-Pierre
16. Thibie
17. La Veuve
18. Villers-le-Château
19. Vraux
