= Cherville =

- Commune
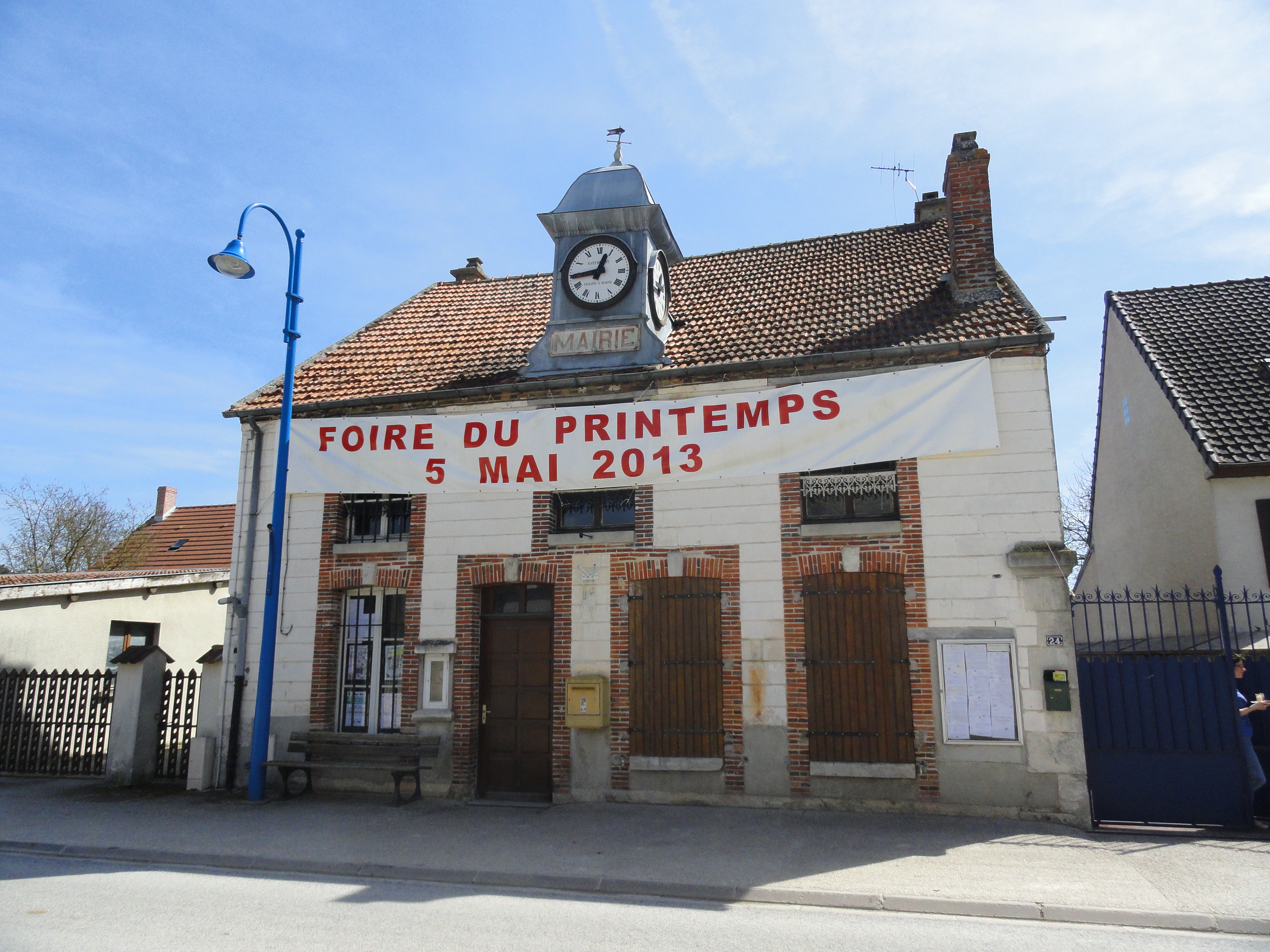
- The town hall in Cherville
- Location of Cherville
- Location within France Location within Grand Est
- Coordinates: 49°01′10″N 4°09′52″E
- Country: France
- Region: Grand Est
- Department: Marne
- Arrondissement: Châlons-en-Champagne
- Canton: Châlons-en-Champagne-2
- Intercommunality: CA Châlons-en-Champagne

Government
  - Mayor (2020–2026): Nicolas Valthier
- Area^{1}: 3.76 km^{2} (1.45 sq mi)
- Elevation: 77 m (253 ft)
- Population (2023): 85
  - Density: 23/km^{2} (59/sq mi)
- Time zone: UTC+01:00 (CET)
  - Summer (DST): UTC+02:00 (CEST)
- INSEE/Postal code: 51150 /51150
- ^{1} French Land Register data, which excludes lakes, ponds, glaciers > 1 km^{2} (0.386 sq mi or 247 acres) and river estuaries.

Cherville (French pronunciation: [ʃɛʁvil]) is a commune in the Marne department in north-eastern France.

== See also ==
- Communes of the Marne department
