= Les Grandes-Loges =

Grandes-Loges
- Commune
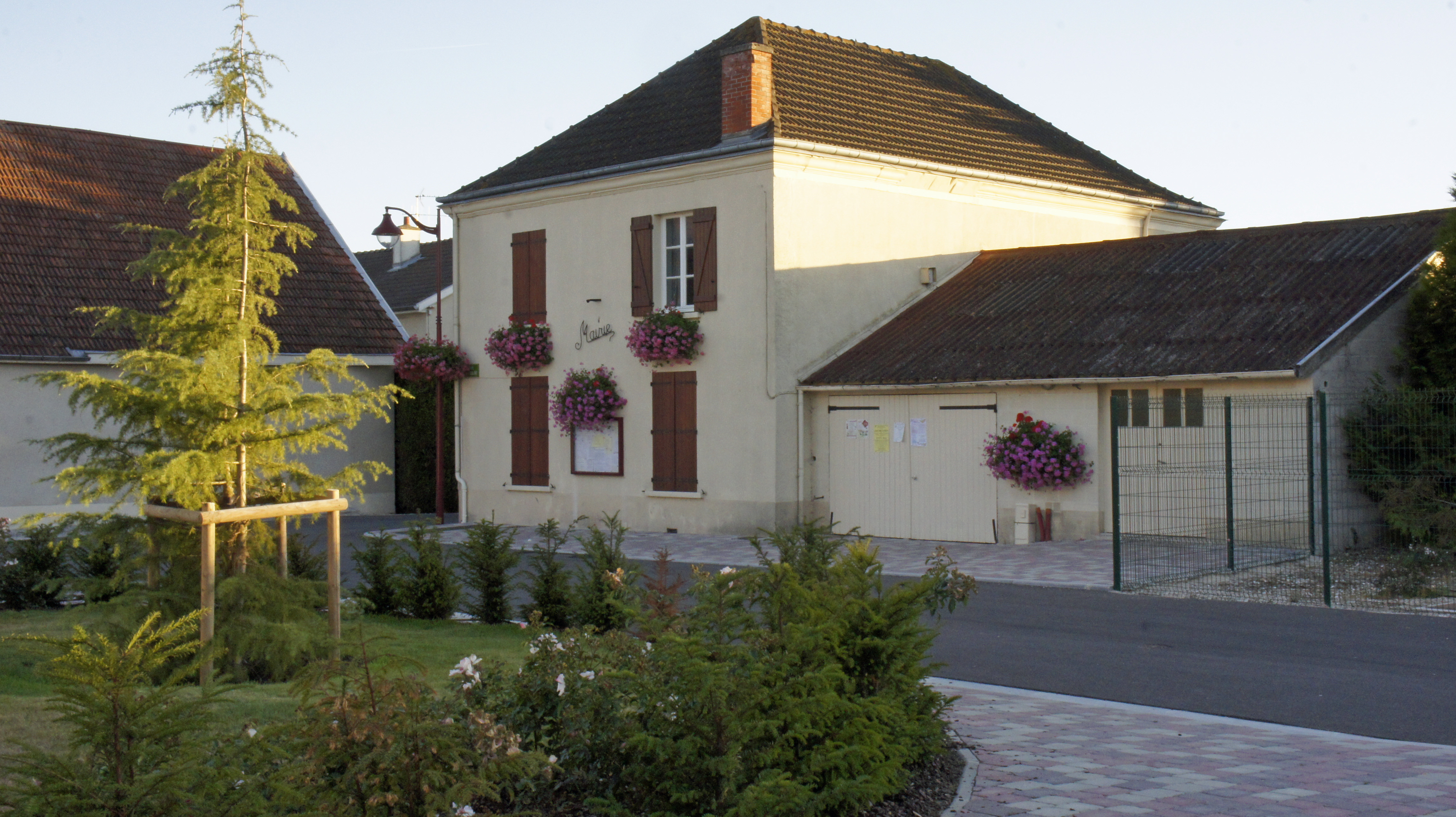
- The town hall in Les Grandes-Loges
- Location of Grandes-Loges
- Location within France Location within Grand Est
- Coordinates: 49°03′57″N 4°17′39″E
- Country: France
- Region: Grand Est
- Department: Marne
- Arrondissement: Châlons-en-Champagne
- Canton: Châlons-en-Champagne-2
- Intercommunality: CA Châlons-en-Champagne

Government
  - Mayor (2020–2026): Guy Janson
- Area^{1}: 12.82 km^{2} (4.95 sq mi)
- Elevation: 109 m (358 ft)
- Population (2023): 284
  - Density: 22.2/km^{2} (57.4/sq mi)
- Time zone: UTC+01:00 (CET)
  - Summer (DST): UTC+02:00 (CEST)
- INSEE/Postal code: 51278 /51400
- ^{1} French Land Register data, which excludes lakes, ponds, glaciers > 1 km^{2} (0.386 sq mi or 247 acres) and river estuaries.

Les Grandes-Loges (French pronunciation: [le ɡʁɑ̃d lɔʒ]) is a commune in the Marne department in the Grand Est region in north-eastern France.

== See also ==
- Communes of the Marne department
