= Aulnay-sur-Marne =

- Commune
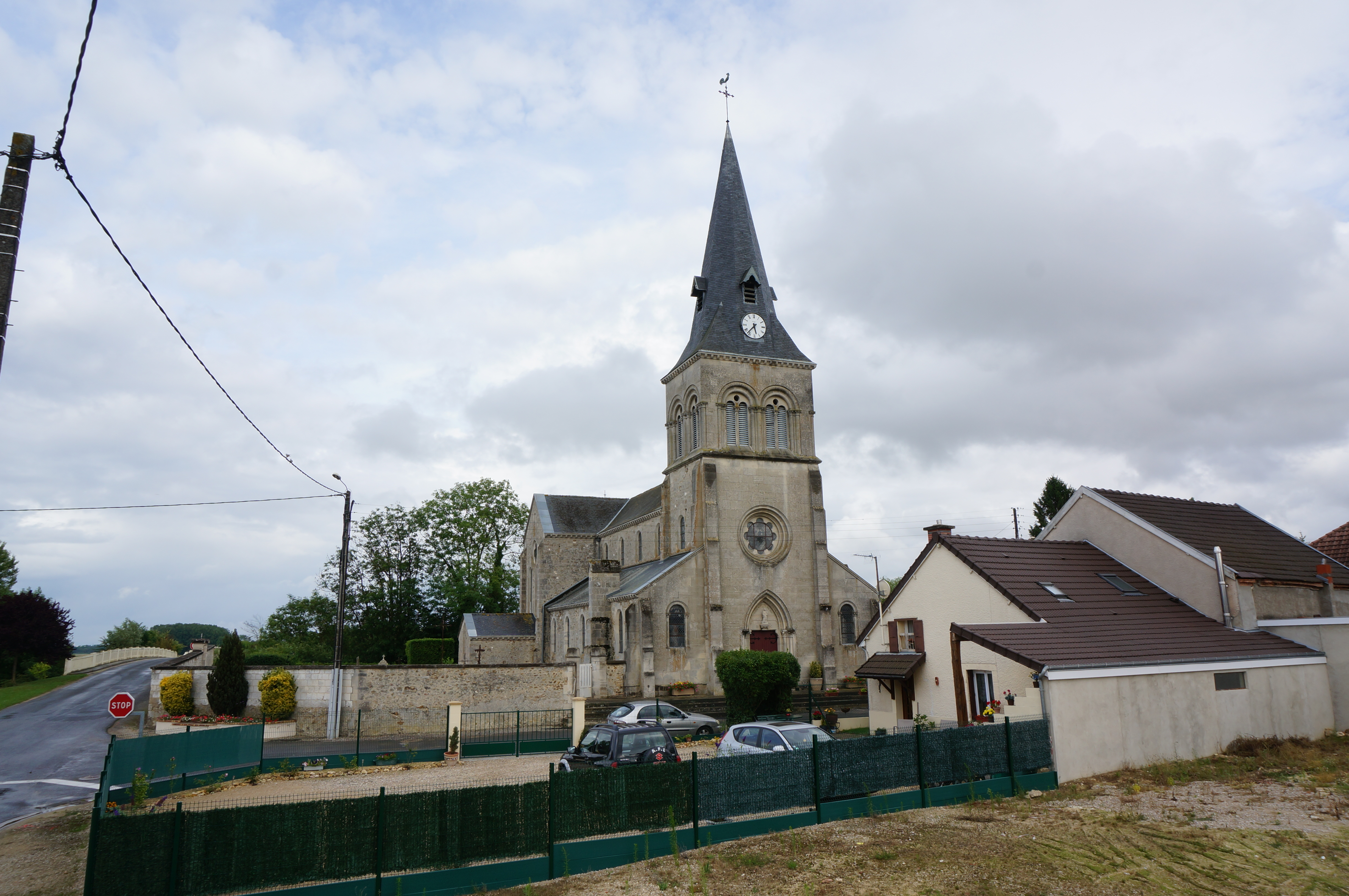
- The church in Aulnay-sur-Marne

- Coat of arms
- Location of Aulnay-sur-Marne
- Location within France Location within Grand Est
- Coordinates: 49°00′30″N 4°12′18″E
- Country: France
- Region: Grand Est
- Department: Marne
- Arrondissement: Châlons-en-Champagne
- Canton: Châlons-en-Champagne-2
- Intercommunality: CA Châlons-en-Champagne

Government
  - Mayor (2020–2026): Philippe Desgrouas
- Area^{1}: 9.07 km^{2} (3.50 sq mi)
- Elevation: 78 m (256 ft)
- Population (2023): 279
  - Density: 30.8/km^{2} (79.7/sq mi)
- Time zone: UTC+01:00 (CET)
  - Summer (DST): UTC+02:00 (CEST)
- INSEE/Postal code: 51023 /51150
- ^{1} French Land Register data, which excludes lakes, ponds, glaciers > 1 km^{2} (0.386 sq mi or 247 acres) and river estuaries.

Aulnay-sur-Marne (French pronunciation: [o(l)nɛ syʁ maʁn], literally Aulnay on Marne) is a commune in the Marne department in northeastern France.

== Population ==
Historical population
Year	Pop.	±% p.a.
1968	183	—
1975	182	−0.08%
1982	197	+1.14%
1990	230	+1.95%
1999	214	−0.80%
2007	227	+0.74%
2012	238	+0.95%
2017	259	+1.71%
2023	279	+1.25%
Source: INSEE

== See also ==
- Communes of the Marne department
