= Vraux =

- Commune
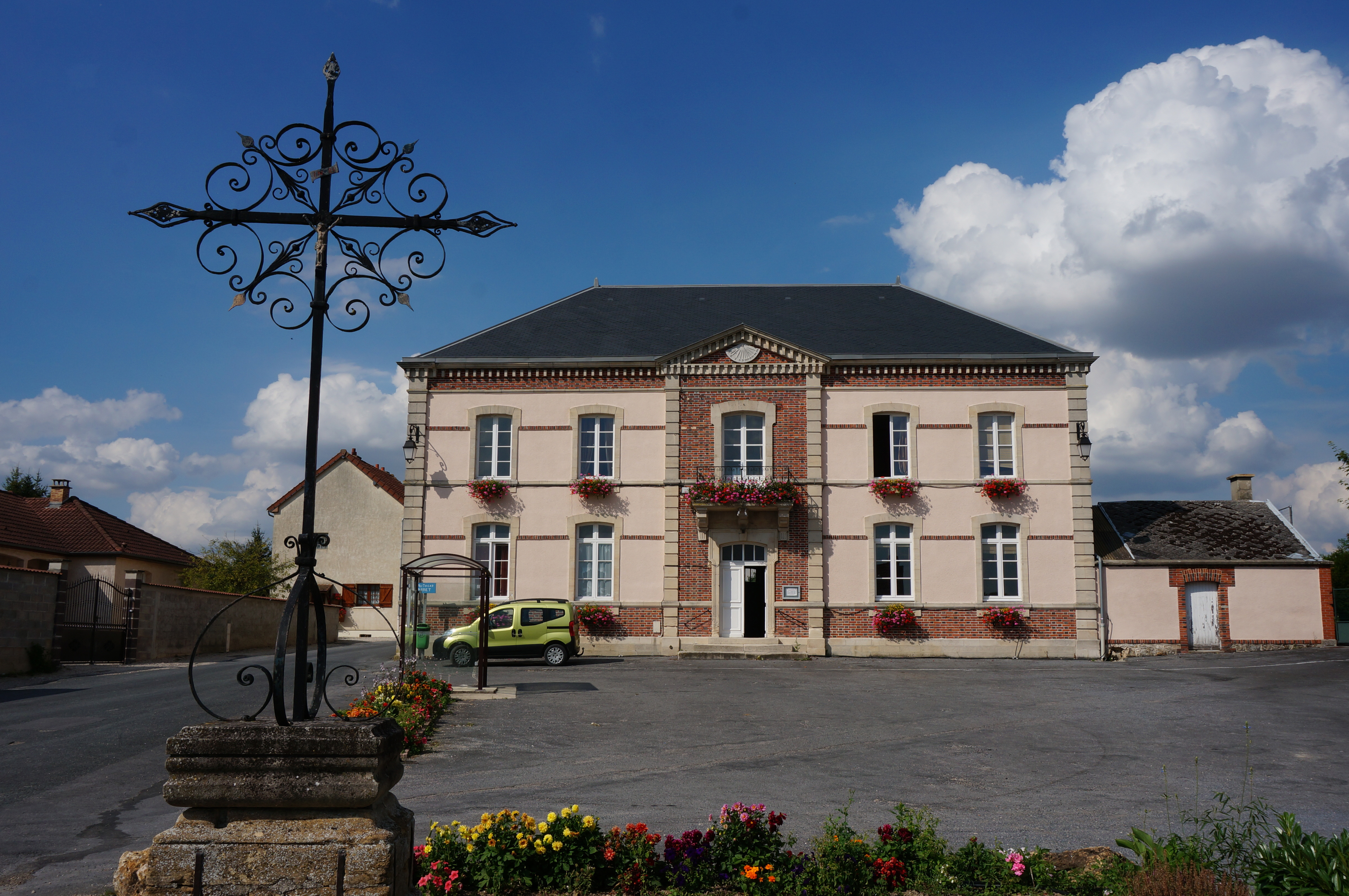
- The town hall in Vraux
- Location of Vraux
- Location within France Location within Grand Est
- Coordinates: 49°01′44″N 4°14′16″E
- Country: France
- Region: Grand Est
- Department: Marne
- Arrondissement: Châlons-en-Champagne
- Canton: Châlons-en-Champagne-2
- Intercommunality: CA Châlons-en-Champagne

Government
  - Mayor (2020–2026): Sabine Galicher
- Area^{1}: 12.8 km^{2} (4.9 sq mi)
- Elevation: 82 m (269 ft)
- Population (2023): 460
  - Density: 36/km^{2} (93/sq mi)
- Time zone: UTC+01:00 (CET)
  - Summer (DST): UTC+02:00 (CEST)
- INSEE/Postal code: 51656 /51150
- ^{1} French Land Register data, which excludes lakes, ponds, glaciers > 1 km^{2} (0.386 sq mi or 247 acres) and river estuaries.

Vraux (French pronunciation: [vʁo]) is a commune in the Marne department in north-eastern France.

== See also ==
- Communes of the Marne department
