= Canton of Châlons-en-Champagne-1 =

Coordinates: 48.95°N 4.35°E

The canton of Châlons-en-Champagne-1 is an administrative division of the Marne department, in northeastern France. Its borders were modified during the French canton reorganisation which came into effect in March 2015. Its seat is in Châlons-en-Champagne.

It consists of the following communes:

1. Châlons-en-Champagne (partly)
2. Compertrix
3. Coolus
4. Fagnières
