= Matougues =

- Commune
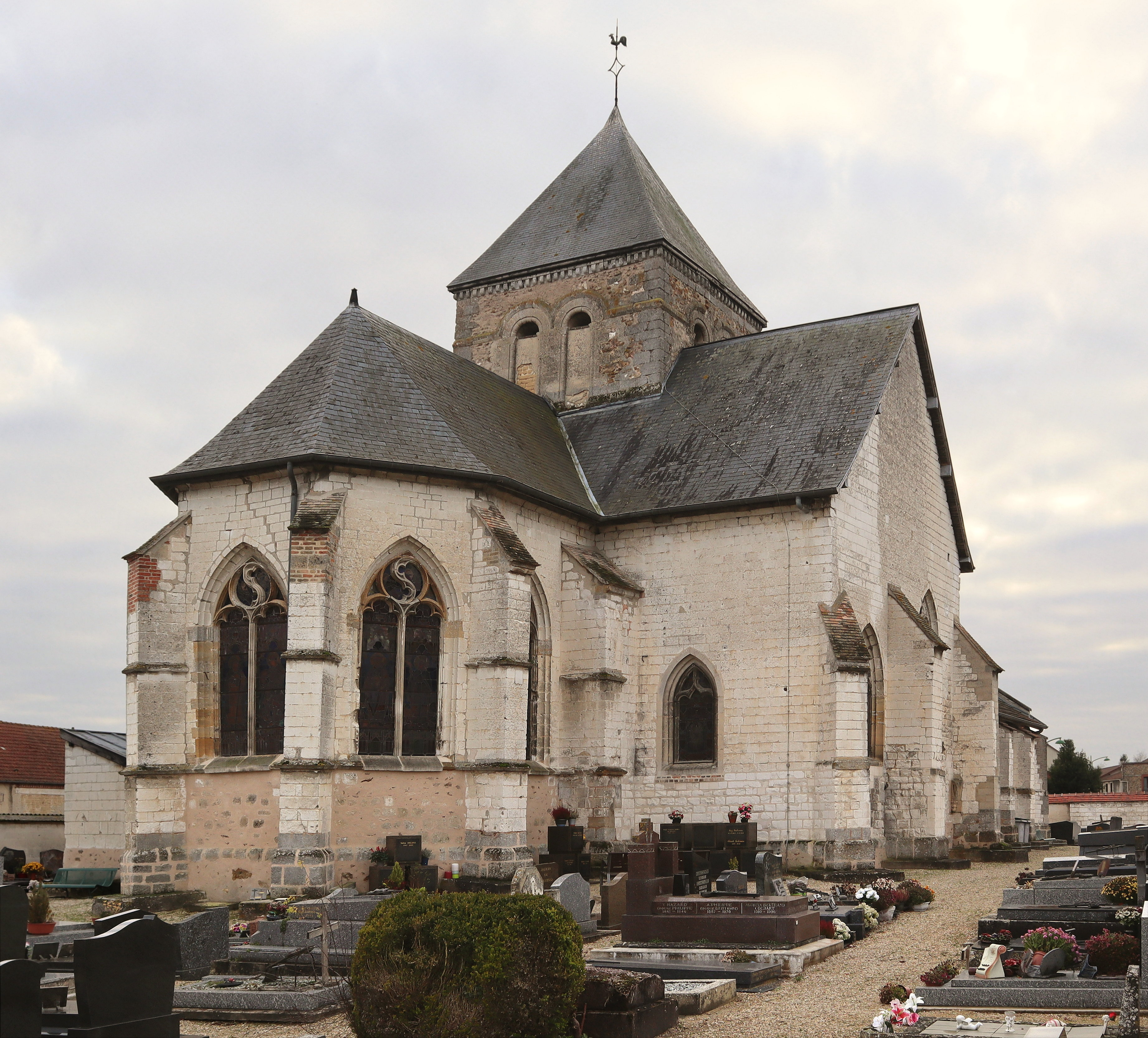
- Église Saint-Georges
- Location of Matougues
- Location within France Location within Grand Est
- Coordinates: 48°59′40″N 4°14′35″E
- Country: France
- Region: Grand Est
- Department: Marne
- Arrondissement: Châlons-en-Champagne
- Canton: Châlons-en-Champagne-2
- Intercommunality: CA Châlons-en-Champagne

Government
  - Mayor (2020–2026): Bruno Adnet
- Area^{1}: 13.77 km^{2} (5.32 sq mi)
- Elevation: 81 m (266 ft)
- Population (2023): 636
  - Density: 46.2/km^{2} (120/sq mi)
- Time zone: UTC+01:00 (CET)
  - Summer (DST): UTC+02:00 (CEST)
- INSEE/Postal code: 51357 /51510
- ^{1} French Land Register data, which excludes lakes, ponds, glaciers > 1 km^{2} (0.386 sq mi or 247 acres) and river estuaries.

Matougues (French pronunciation: [matuɡ]) is a commune in the Marne department in north-eastern France.

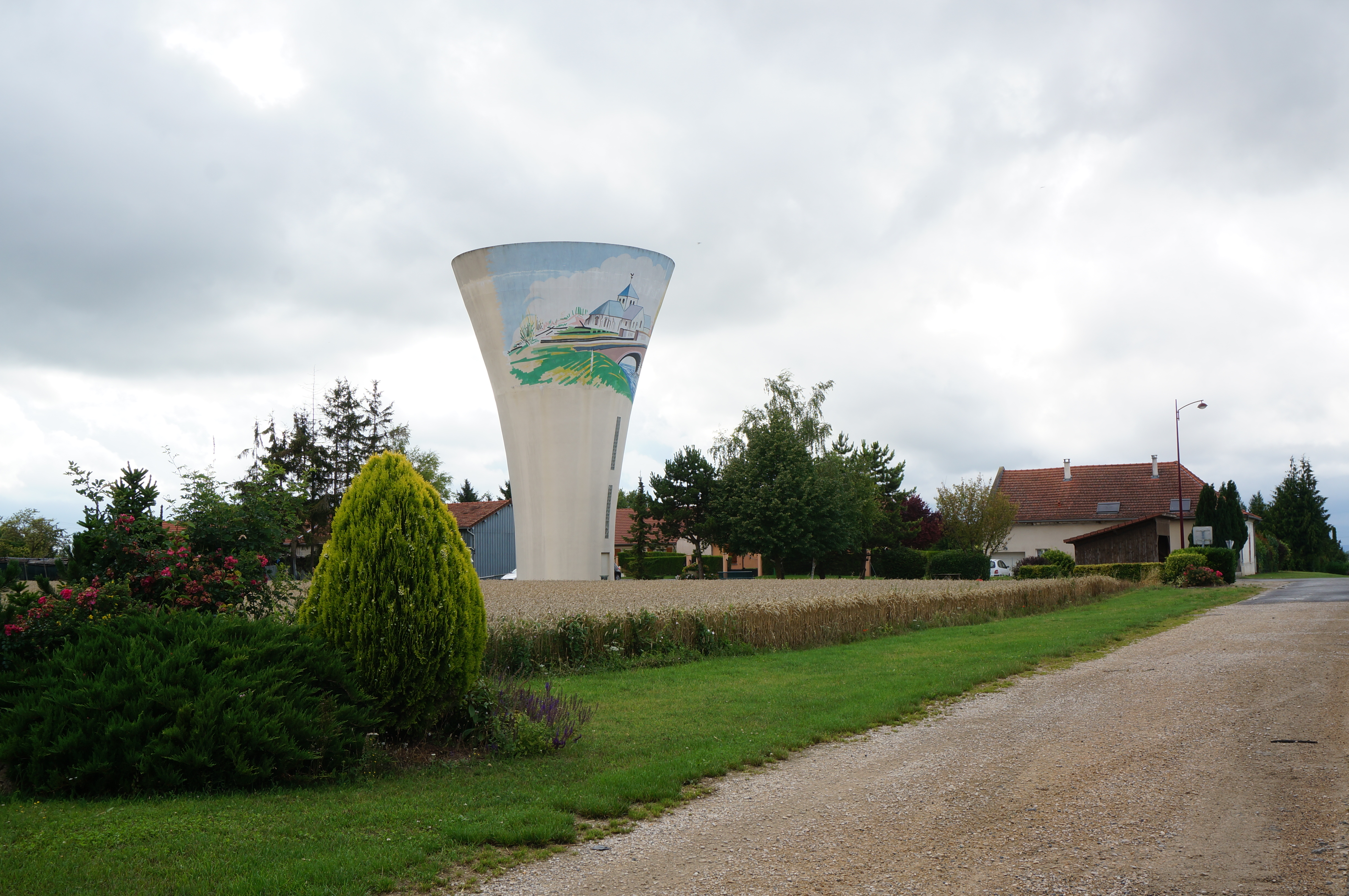
The water tower in Matougues

== See also ==
- Communes of the Marne department
