= Villers-le-Château =

- Commune
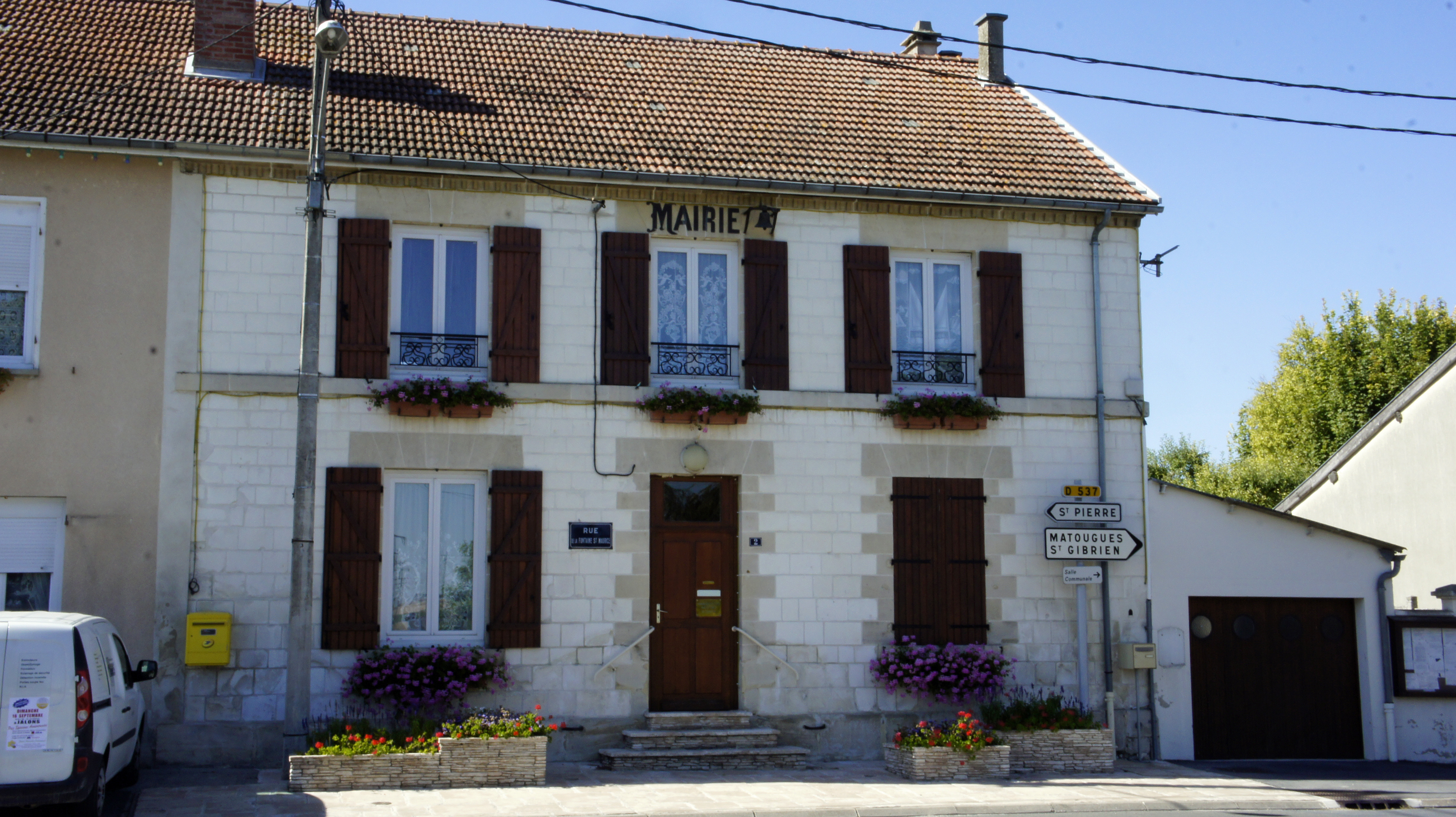
- The town hall in Villers-le-Château
- Location of Villers-le-Château
- Location within France Location within Grand Est
- Coordinates: 48°57′41″N 4°16′08″E
- Country: France
- Region: Grand Est
- Department: Marne
- Arrondissement: Châlons-en-Champagne
- Canton: Châlons-en-Champagne-2
- Intercommunality: CA Châlons-en-Champagne

Government
  - Mayor (2020–2026): Joël Thouvenin
- Area^{1}: 20.94 km^{2} (8.08 sq mi)
- Elevation: 81 m (266 ft)
- Population (2023): 299
  - Density: 14.3/km^{2} (37.0/sq mi)
- Time zone: UTC+01:00 (CET)
  - Summer (DST): UTC+02:00 (CEST)
- INSEE/Postal code: 51634 /51510
- ^{1} French Land Register data, which excludes lakes, ponds, glaciers > 1 km^{2} (0.386 sq mi or 247 acres) and river estuaries.

Villers-le-Château (French pronunciation: [vilɛʁ lə ʃɑto]) is a village and commune in the Marne département of north-eastern France.

== See also ==
- Communes of the Marne department
