= Châlons Vatry Airport =

Airport in France

Châlons Vatry Airport Aéroport Châlons-Vatry
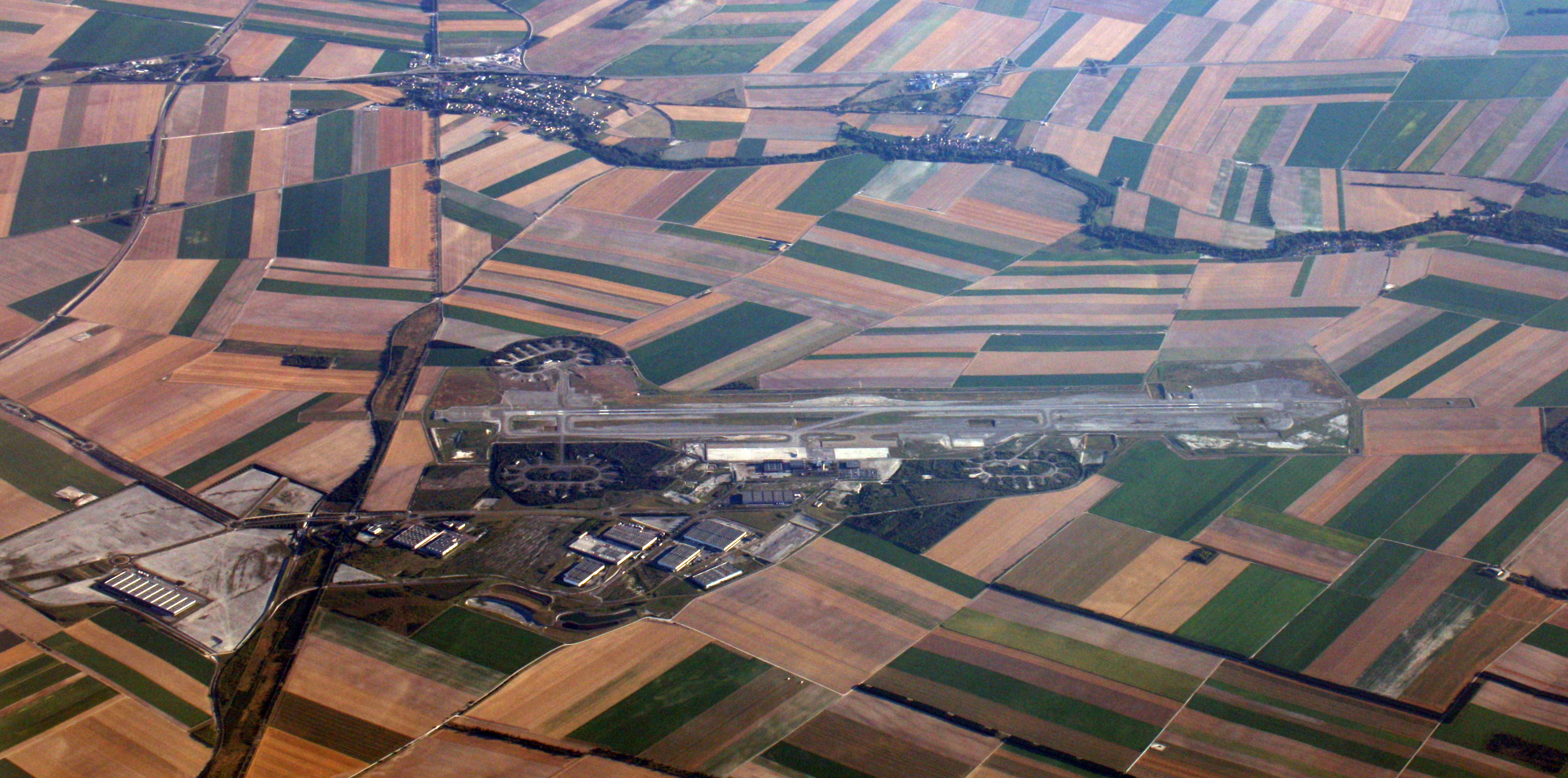
- IATA: XCR; ICAO: LFOK

Summary
- Airport type: Public
- Operator: Société d'Exploitation Vatry Europort (SEVE)
- Serves: Châlons-en-Champagne
- Location: Vatry
- Elevation AMSL: 586 ft / 179 m
- Coordinates: 48°46′24″N 04°12′22″E
- Website: www.xcr-airport.com/en/

Map
- Location in the Champagne-Ardenne XCR/LFOK (France)

Runways
Direction	Length		Surface
Direction	m	ft	Surface
10/28	3,860	12,664	Concrete

Statistics (2018)
- Passengers: 61,826
- Passenger change 17-18: ▼43.2%
- Sources: French AIP, UAF, DAFIF

Châlons Vatry Airport (IATA: XCR, ICAO: LFOK) is a minor international airport serving Châlons-en-Champagne and the Grand Est region in northeastern France. It is located 22 km (14 mi) southeast of Châlons-en-Champagne, near Vatry, in the Marne department. It opened as Vatry Air Base in 1953 and switched from military to civilian use in 2000.

It is marketed as XCR Airport and gave its former name, Vatry Europort, to the former communauté de communes de l'Europort. For passenger traffic, it is also unofficially marketed as Paris-Châlons or Paris-Vatry (Disney), although it is 147 km (91 mi) east of central Paris and approximately 105 km (65 mi) away from Disneyland Paris.

== History ==
Châlons Vatry Airport's origins began in 1950 when, with the Cold War, NATO faced several problems while attempting to solve the air power survival equation. Planning for first strike survival in both conventional and nuclear wars had to be considered. Construction began in 1953, and Vatry Air Base was designed for 50 fighters with three large hangars constructed. With the French withdrawal from the integrated NATO military structure in 1967, the American forces left Vatry Air Base and it was closed.

For many years, Vatry Air Base was under the control of the French Air Force and used for a training facility. Around 2000, it was sold to civil interests and today is being used as an international heavy cargo and commercial passenger airport.

Châlons Vatry Airport also serves as a pilot training site for both commercial and military planes. Users of the facility include: Air France, British Airways, Brussels Airlines, KLM, Transavia, Transavia France, Swiss International Air Lines.

Due to the length of its runway, Airbus often uses this airport for testing new aircraft, such as the tests for A350 Velocity Minimum Unstick.

In March 2021, ASI-GROUP is set up on the Marne airport site in a 2,500 m2 hangar to develop its customer delivery center and part of its aircraft transformation and fitting activities. This hangar will accommodate aircraft such as ATR 72, Airbus A321 or Boeing 737 or large helicopters.

== Facilities ==
The airport is 179 metres (586 ft) above mean sea level. It has one paved runway designated 10/28 of 3,860 by 45 metres (12,664 ft × 148 ft).

== Airlines and destinations ==
The following airlines operate regular scheduled and charter flights at Châlons Vatry Airport:

Airlines	Destinations
Ryanair	Marrakesh, Porto

== Accidents and incidents ==
On 21 December 2023, an Airbus A340 operated by Romanian charter airline Legend Airlines was stopped at the airport by the authorities during a technical stop, flying from Fujairah in the United Arab Emirates to Nicaragua, on suspicions of human trafficking. The airline denied any wrongdoing.
