= Fagnières =

- Commune
- Coat of arms
- Location of Fagnières
- Location within France Location within Grand Est
- Coordinates: 48°57′51″N 4°19′09″E
- Country: France
- Region: Grand Est
- Department: Marne
- Arrondissement: Châlons-en-Champagne
- Canton: Châlons-en-Champagne-1
- Intercommunality: Châlons-en-Champagne

Government
  - Mayor (2020–2026): Denis Fenat
- Area^{1}: 19.48 km^{2} (7.52 sq mi)
- Elevation: 85 m (279 ft)
- Highest elevation: 122 m (400 ft)
- Lowest elevation: 77 m (253 ft)
- Population (2023): 4,858
  - Density: 249.4/km^{2} (645.9/sq mi)
- Time zone: UTC+01:00 (CET)
  - Summer (DST): UTC+02:00 (CEST)
- INSEE/Postal code: 51242 /51510
- ^{1} French Land Register data, which excludes lakes, ponds, glaciers > 1 km^{2} (0.386 sq mi or 247 acres) and river estuaries.

Fagnières (French pronunciation: [faɲɛʁ]) is a commune in the Marne department in north-eastern France.

== Population ==
Historical population
Year	Pop.	±% p.a.
1968	1,319	—
1975	2,532	+9.76%
1982	3,425	+4.41%
1990	4,949	+4.71%
1999	5,046	+0.22%
2007	4,606	−1.13%
2012	4,474	−0.58%
2017	4,834	+1.56%
2023	4,858	+0.08%
Source: INSEE

== Climate ==
Climate data for Châlons-en-Champagne (Fagnières), elevation: 105 m (344 ft), 1981–2010 normals, extremes 1970–present
Month	Jan	Feb	Mar	Apr	May	Jun	Jul	Aug	Sep	Oct	Nov	Dec	Year
Record high °C (°F)	15.9 (60.6)	20.5 (68.9)	24.4 (75.9)	28.7 (83.7)	32.3 (90.1)	36.7 (98.1)	41.8 (107.2)	41.1 (106.0)	33.0 (91.4)	28.2 (82.8)	21.8 (71.2)	16.8 (62.2)	41.8 (107.2)
Mean daily maximum °C (°F)	5.2 (41.4)	7.2 (45.0)	11.5 (52.7)	15.1 (59.2)	19.2 (66.6)	22.4 (72.3)	25.5 (77.9)	25.0 (77.0)	20.7 (69.3)	15.7 (60.3)	9.7 (49.5)	6.2 (43.2)	15.4 (59.7)
Daily mean °C (°F)	2.9 (37.2)	3.7 (38.7)	7.0 (44.6)	9.7 (49.5)	13.7 (56.7)	16.6 (61.9)	19.1 (66.4)	18.8 (65.8)	15.3 (59.5)	11.5 (52.7)	6.5 (43.7)	3.6 (38.5)	10.7 (51.3)
Mean daily minimum °C (°F)	0.1 (32.2)	0.1 (32.2)	2.5 (36.5)	4.3 (39.7)	8.3 (46.9)	10.8 (51.4)	12.8 (55.0)	12.6 (54.7)	9.9 (49.8)	7.2 (45.0)	3.4 (38.1)	1.1 (34.0)	6.1 (43.0)
Record low °C (°F)	−21.0 (−5.8)	−14.6 (5.7)	−12.4 (9.7)	−5.2 (22.6)	−0.7 (30.7)	0.3 (32.5)	4.0 (39.2)	3.6 (38.5)	0.8 (33.4)	−4.0 (24.8)	−13.0 (8.6)	−18.0 (−0.4)	−21.0 (−5.8)
Average precipitation mm (inches)	49.8 (1.96)	43.5 (1.71)	50.2 (1.98)	48.0 (1.89)	56.2 (2.21)	61.1 (2.41)	56.5 (2.22)	55.6 (2.19)	52.6 (2.07)	61.1 (2.41)	52.5 (2.07)	62.2 (2.45)	649.3 (25.56)
Average precipitation days (≥ 1.0 mm)	10.8	9.3	10.5	9.2	10.2	9.2	8.3	7.8	8.2	9.9	10.1	11.3	114.7
Source: Meteo France

== See also ==
- Communes of the Marne department
