= Condé-sur-Marne =

Condé sur Marne
- Commune
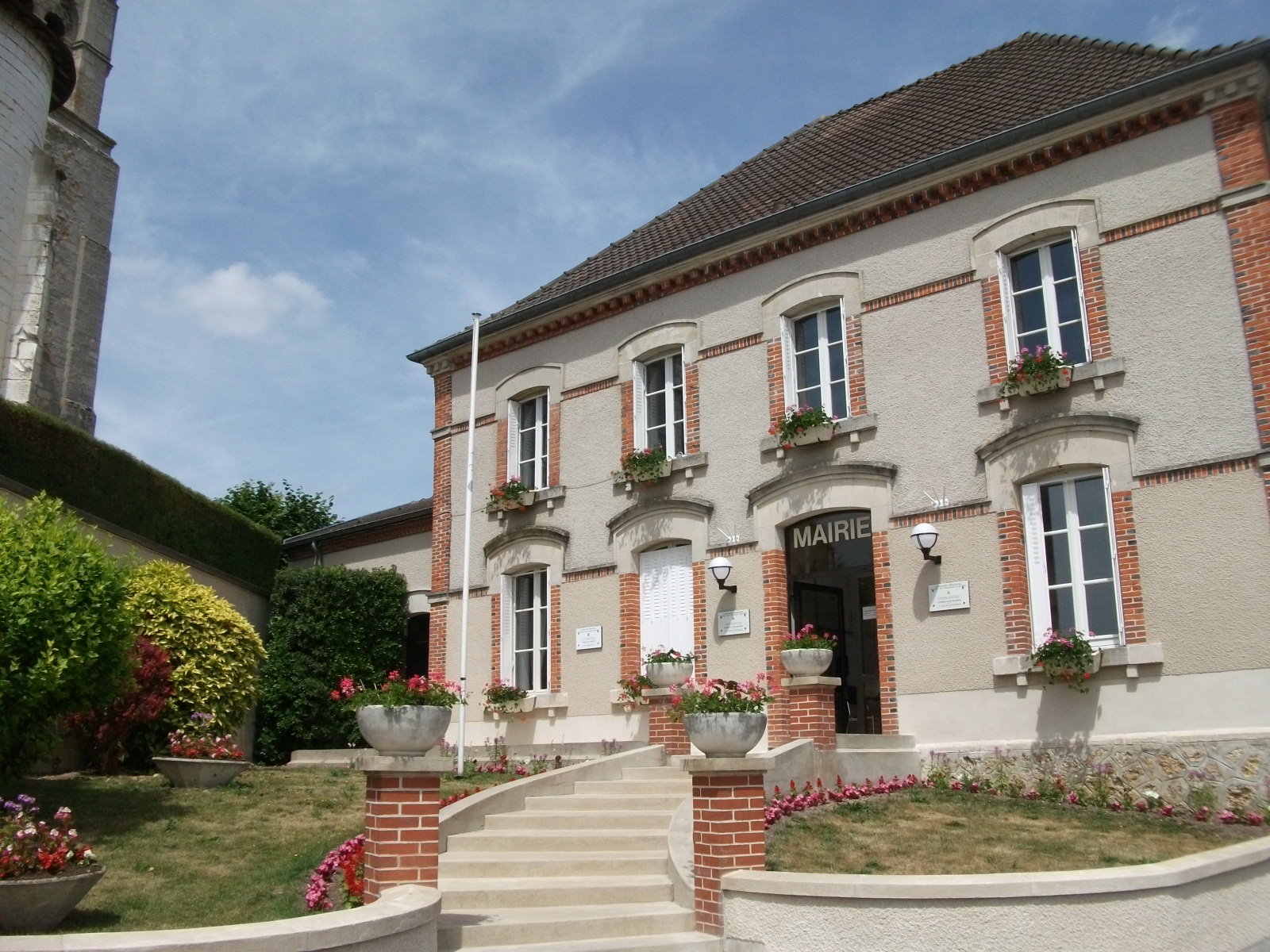
- The town hall in Condé-sur-Marne

- Coat of arms
- Location of Condé sur Marne
- Location within France Location within Grand Est
- Coordinates: 49°02′45″N 4°10′49″E
- Country: France
- Region: Grand Est
- Department: Marne
- Arrondissement: Châlons-en-Champagne
- Canton: Châlons-en-Champagne-2
- Intercommunality: CA Châlons-en-Champagne

Government
  - Mayor (2020–2026): Romain Sinner
- Area^{1}: 12.3 km^{2} (4.7 sq mi)
- Elevation: 80 m (260 ft)
- Population (2023): 747
  - Density: 60.7/km^{2} (157/sq mi)
- Time zone: UTC+01:00 (CET)
  - Summer (DST): UTC+02:00 (CEST)
- INSEE/Postal code: 51161 /51150
- ^{1} French Land Register data, which excludes lakes, ponds, glaciers > 1 km^{2} (0.386 sq mi or 247 acres) and river estuaries.

Condé-sur-Marne (French pronunciation: [kɔ̃de syʁ maʁn], literally Condé on Marne) is a commune in the Marne department in north-eastern France.

== See also ==
- Communes of the Marne department
