= Communauté d'agglomération de Châlons-en-Champagne =

Coordinates: 48.96°N 4.37°E

Châlons-en-Champagne
- Communauté d'agglomération
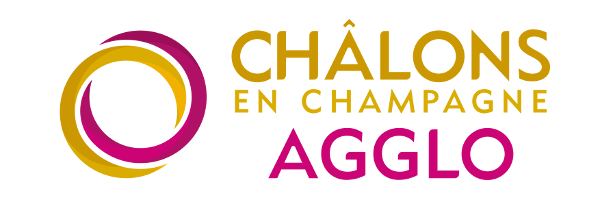

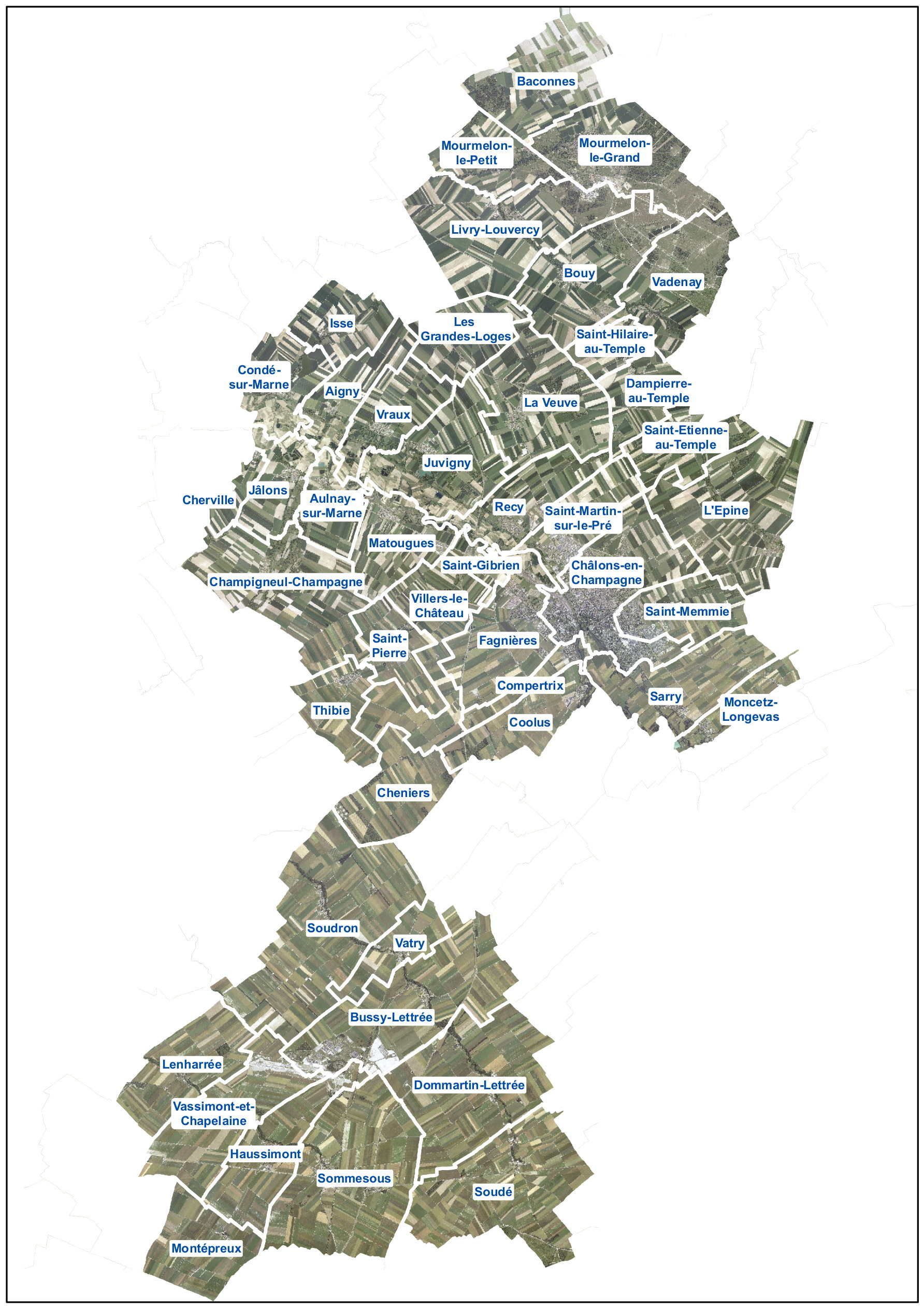
- Map of communauté d'agglomération de Châlons-en-Champagne
- Country: France
- Region: Grand Est
- Department: Marne
- No. of communes: {{{nbcomm}}}
- Established: 1 January 2000

Government
  - President: Jacques Jesson
- Area: 810.35 km^{2} (312.88 sq mi)
- Population (2018): 79,518
  - Density: 98.128/km^{2} (254.15/sq mi)
- Website: www.chalons-agglo.fr/cac

Châlons Agglo, formally the Communauté d'agglomération de Châlons-en-Champagne, is a communauté d'agglomération around Châlons-en-Champagne in the French department of Marne in the region of Grand Est.

It was formed in 2000 from the previous District de Châlons-en-Champagne, which consisted of nine communes. In 2014, it was expanded to 38 communes, when it was merged with the three communautés de communes of L'Europort, Jâlons, and La Région de Condé-sur-Marne, except that Pocancy in Jâlons joined the Communauté de communes de la Région de Vertus (which merged into the Communauté d'agglomération Épernay, Coteaux et Plaine de Champagne in 2017). The three communautés de communes were respectively named after Vatry Europort, Jâlons and Condé-sur-Marne. In 2017, the eight communes of the former Communauté de communes de la Région de Mourmelon joined the Communauté d'agglomération de Châlons-en-Champagne.

Its area is 810.4 km^{2}. Its population was 79,518 in 2018, of which 44,246 in Châlons-en-Champagne proper.

== Composition ==
Communes in the Communauté d'agglomération of Châlons-en-Champagne
Commune	Year joined	Previous communauté
Châlons-en-Champagne	2000	Châlons-en-Champagne
Aigny	2014	Condé-sur-Marne
Aulnay-sur-Marne	2014	Jâlons
Baconnes	2017	Mourmelon
Bouy	2017	Mourmelon
Bussy-Lettrée	2014	Europort
Champigneul-Champagne	2014	Jâlons
Cheniers	2014	Europort
Cherville	2014	Jâlons
Compertrix	2000	Châlons-en-Champagne
Condé-sur-Marne	2014	Condé-sur-Marne
Coolus	2000	Châlons-en-Champagne
Dommartin-Lettrée	2014	Europort
L'Épine	2004	Sources de la Vesle
Fagnières	2000	Châlons-en-Champagne
Les Grandes-Loges	2013	
Haussimont	2014	Europort
Isse	2014	Condé-sur-Marne
Jâlons	2014	Jâlons
Juvigny	2014	Condé-sur-Marne
Lenharrée	2014	Europort
Livry-Louvercy	2017	Mourmelon
Matougues	2014	Jâlons
Moncetz-Longevas	2004	
Montépreux	2014	Europort
Mourmelon-le-Grand	2017	Mourmelon
Mourmelon-le-Petit	2017	Mourmelon
La Neuville-au-Temple	2017	Mourmelon
Recy	2000	Châlons-en-Champagne
Saint-Étienne-au-Temple	2004	
Saint-Gibrien	2000	Châlons-en-Champagne
Saint-Martin-sur-le-Pré	2000	Châlons-en-Champagne
Saint-Memmie	2000	Châlons-en-Champagne
Saint-Pierre	2014	Jâlons
Sarry	2000	Châlons-en-Champagne
Sommesous	2014	Europort
Soudé	2014	Europort
Soudron	2014	Europort
Thibie	2014	Jâlons
Vadenay	2017	Mourmelon
Vassimont-et-Chapelaine	2014	Europort
Vatry	2014	Europort
La Veuve	2009	
Villers-le-Château	2014	Jâlons
Vraux	2014	Condé-sur-Marne
