= Coolus =

- Commune
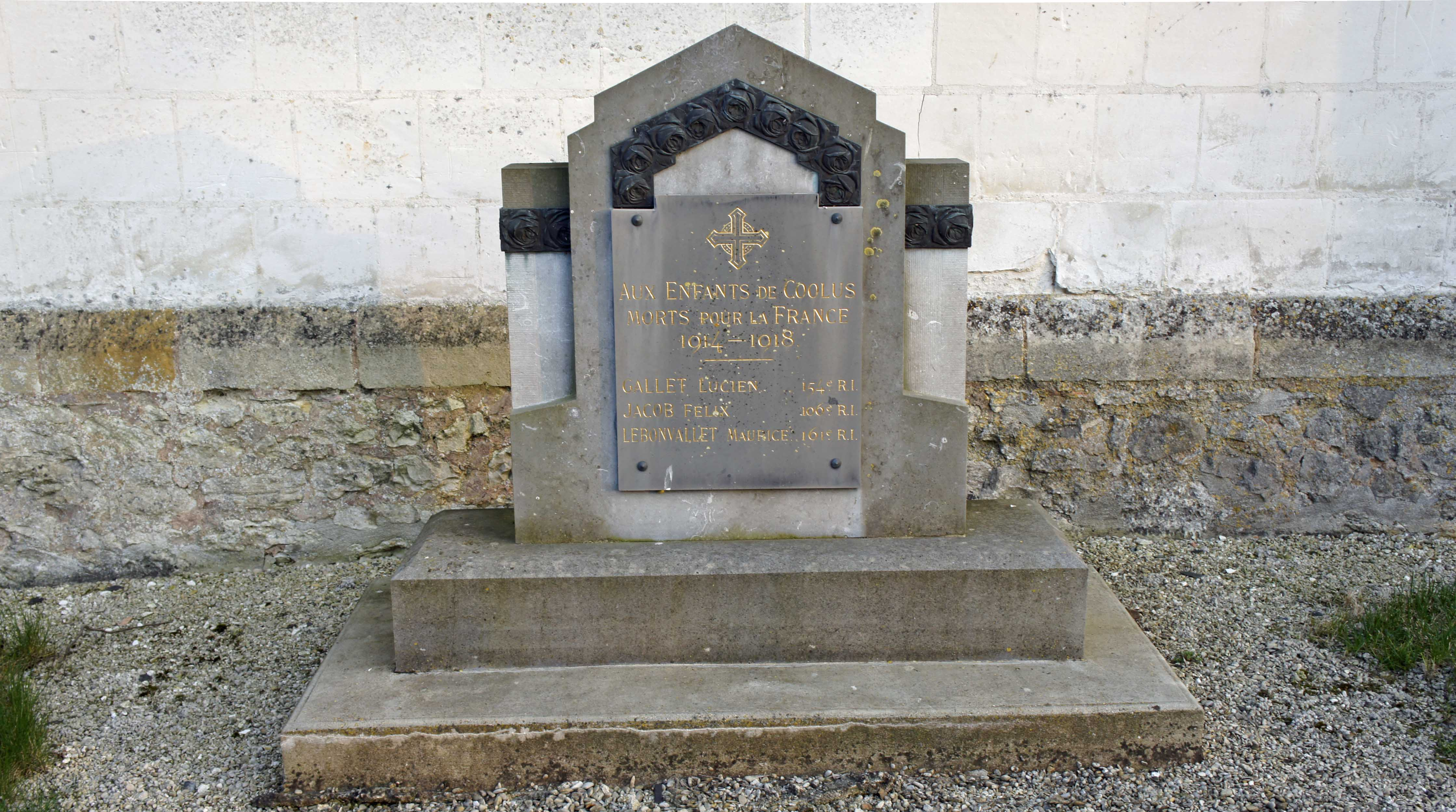
- The war memorial in Coolus

- Coat of arms
- Location of Coolus
- Location within France Location within Grand Est
- Coordinates: 48°55′29″N 4°21′18″E
- Country: France
- Region: Grand Est
- Department: Marne
- Arrondissement: Châlons-en-Champagne
- Canton: Châlons-en-Champagne-1
- Intercommunality: CA Châlons-en-Champagne

Government
  - Mayor (2020–2026): Pierre Charlet
- Area^{1}: 13.18 km^{2} (5.09 sq mi)
- Elevation: 84 m (276 ft)
- Highest elevation: 137 m (449 ft)
- Lowest elevation: 82 m (269 ft)
- Population (2023): 235
  - Density: 17.8/km^{2} (46.2/sq mi)
- Time zone: UTC+01:00 (CET)
  - Summer (DST): UTC+02:00 (CEST)
- INSEE/Postal code: 51168 /51510
- ^{1} French Land Register data, which excludes lakes, ponds, glaciers > 1 km^{2} (0.386 sq mi or 247 acres) and river estuaries.

Coolus (French pronunciation: [kɔly]) is a commune in the Marne department in north-eastern France. It gave its name to the Coolus helmet, a type of ancient Celtic and Roman helmet.

== See also ==
- Communes of the Marne department
