= Jâlons =

- Commune
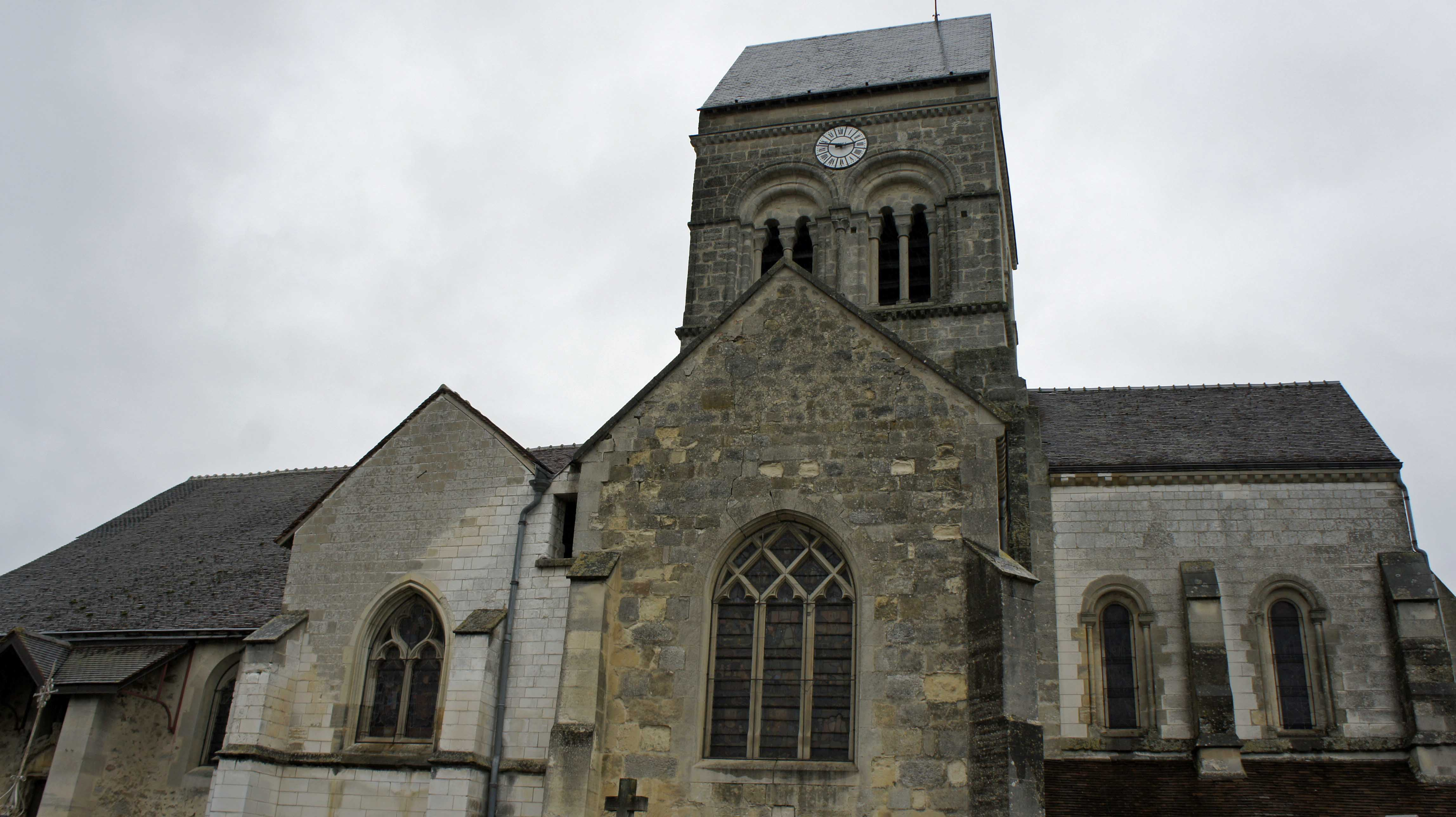
- The church in Jâlons

- Coat of arms
- Location of Jâlons
- Location within France Location within Grand Est
- Coordinates: 49°00′41″N 4°11′09″E
- Country: France
- Region: Grand Est
- Department: Marne
- Arrondissement: Châlons-en-Champagne
- Canton: Châlons-en-Champagne-2
- Intercommunality: CA Châlons-en-Champagne

Government
  - Mayor (2020–2026): Christophe Collot
- Area^{1}: 10.35 km^{2} (4.00 sq mi)
- Elevation: 78 m (256 ft)
- Population (2023): 549
  - Density: 53.0/km^{2} (137/sq mi)
- Time zone: UTC+01:00 (CET)
  - Summer (DST): UTC+02:00 (CEST)
- INSEE/Postal code: 51303 /51150
- ^{1} French Land Register data, which excludes lakes, ponds, glaciers > 1 km^{2} (0.386 sq mi or 247 acres) and river estuaries.

Jâlons (French pronunciation: [ʒalɔ̃]) is a commune in the Marne department in the Grand Est region in north-eastern France.

== See also ==
- Communes of the Marne department
