= Isse =

- Commune
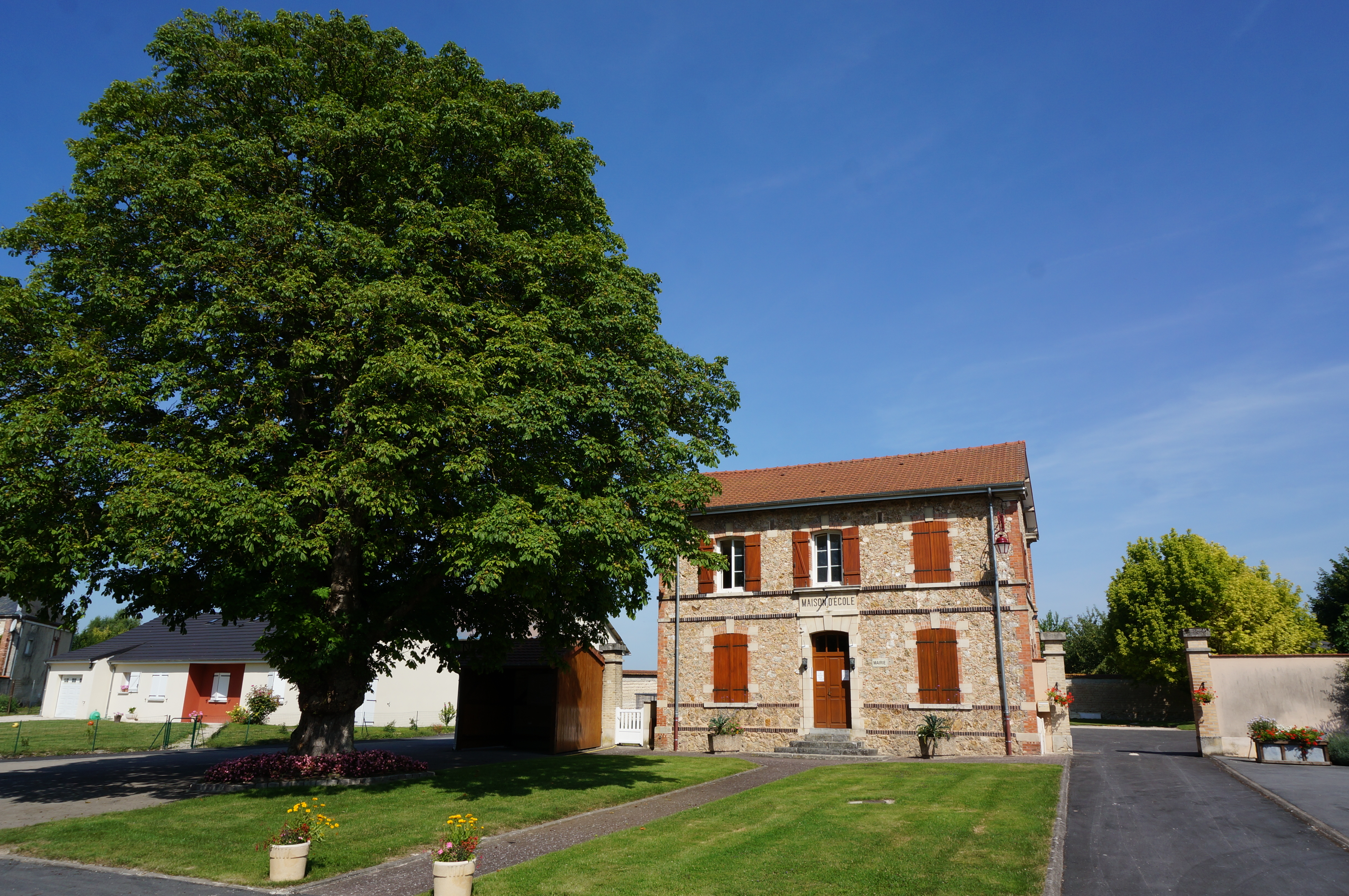
- The town hall in Isse
- Location of Isse
- Location within France Location within Grand Est
- Coordinates: 49°04′01″N 4°12′21″E
- Country: France
- Region: Grand Est
- Department: Marne
- Arrondissement: Châlons-en-Champagne
- Canton: Châlons-en-Champagne-2
- Intercommunality: CA Châlons-en-Champagne

Government
  - Mayor (2020–2026): Nathalie Cotelle
- Area^{1}: 10.81 km^{2} (4.17 sq mi)
- Elevation: 84 m (276 ft)
- Population (2023): 112
  - Density: 10.4/km^{2} (26.8/sq mi)
- Time zone: UTC+01:00 (CET)
  - Summer (DST): UTC+02:00 (CEST)
- INSEE/Postal code: 51301 /51150
- ^{1} French Land Register data, which excludes lakes, ponds, glaciers > 1 km^{2} (0.386 sq mi or 247 acres) and river estuaries.

Isse (French pronunciation: [is]) is a commune in the Marne department in north-eastern France.

== See also ==
- Communes of the Marne department
