= Vatry =

- Commune
- Location of Vatry
- Location within France Location within Grand Est
- Coordinates: 48°49′19″N 4°14′12″E
- Country: France
- Region: Grand Est
- Department: Marne
- Arrondissement: Châlons-en-Champagne
- Canton: Châlons-en-Champagne-3
- Intercommunality: CA Châlons-en-Champagne

Government
  - Mayor (2020–2026): Gérald Piermé
- Area^{1}: 8.39 km^{2} (3.24 sq mi)
- Elevation: 124 m (407 ft)
- Highest elevation: 156 m (512 ft)
- Lowest elevation: 114 m (374 ft)
- Population (2023): 143
  - Density: 17.0/km^{2} (44.1/sq mi)
- Time zone: UTC+01:00 (CET)
  - Summer (DST): UTC+02:00 (CEST)
- INSEE/Postal code: 51595 /51320
- ^{1} French Land Register data, which excludes lakes, ponds, glaciers > 1 km^{2} (0.386 sq mi or 247 acres) and river estuaries.

Vatry (French pronunciation: [vatʁi]) is a commune in the Marne department in north-eastern France, as of 2023 it has a population of 143, and is approximately 45 miles (72 km) south of Reims.

== See also ==
- Communes of the Marne department
