= Saint-Gibrien =

- Commune
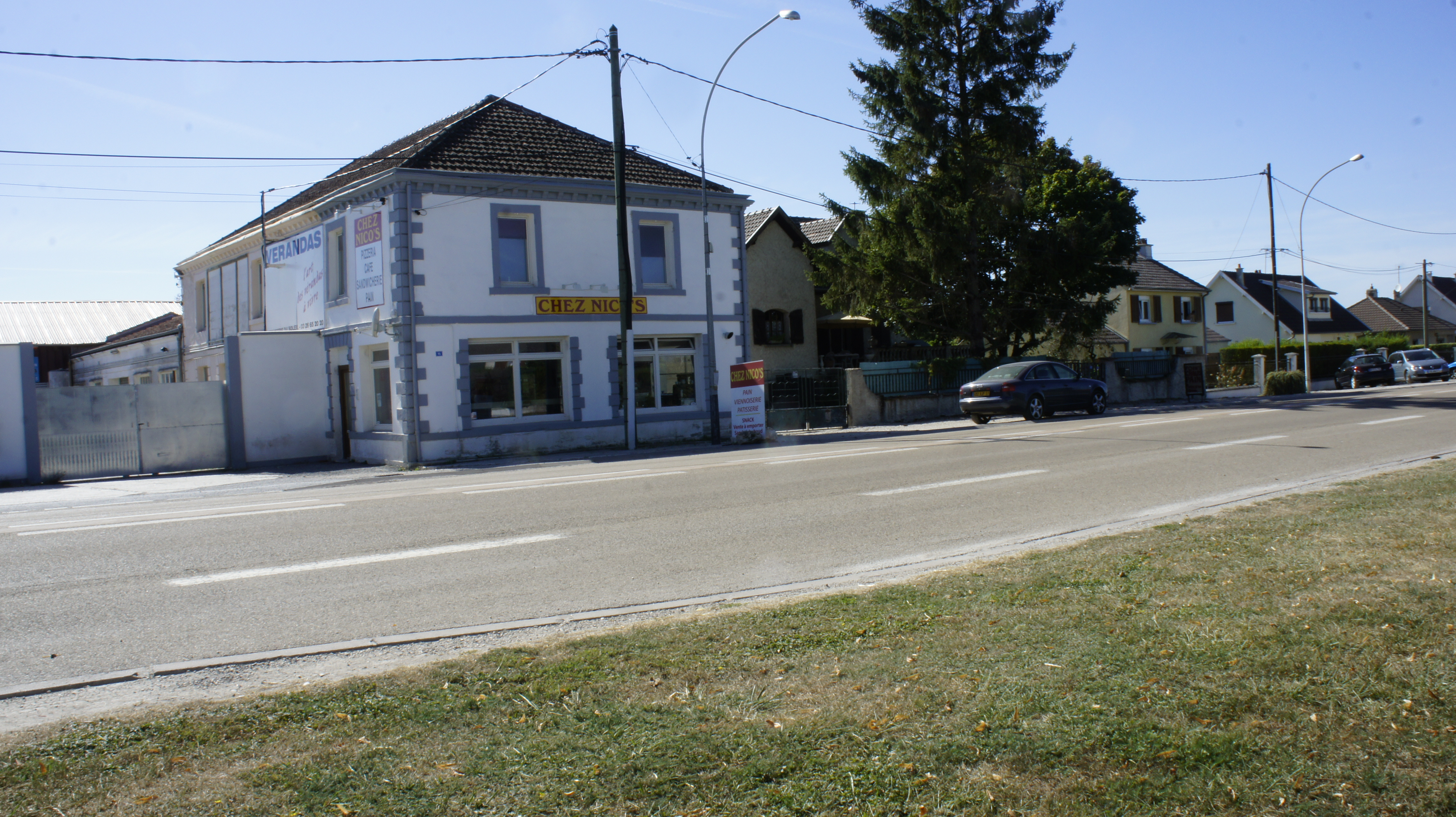
- A view within Saint-Gibrien

- Coat of arms
- Location of Saint-Gibrien
- Location within France Location within Grand Est
- Coordinates: 48°58′26″N 4°18′03″E
- Country: France
- Region: Grand Est
- Department: Marne
- Arrondissement: Châlons-en-Champagne
- Canton: Châlons-en-Champagne-2
- Intercommunality: CA Châlons-en-Champagne

Government
  - Mayor (2020–2026): Herve Huber
- Area^{1}: 4.04 km^{2} (1.56 sq mi)
- Elevation: 107 m (351 ft)
- Population (2023): 552
  - Density: 137/km^{2} (354/sq mi)
- Time zone: UTC+01:00 (CET)
  - Summer (DST): UTC+02:00 (CEST)
- INSEE/Postal code: 51483 /51510
- ^{1} French Land Register data, which excludes lakes, ponds, glaciers > 1 km^{2} (0.386 sq mi or 247 acres) and river estuaries.

Saint-Gibrien (French pronunciation: [sɛ̃ ʒibʁijɛ̃]) is a commune in the Marne department in north-eastern France.

== See also ==
- Communes of the Marne department
- Gibrian, eponymous saint of Saint-Gibrien
