= Côme Clausse de Marchaumont =

French Roman Catholic prelate

- Bishop of Châlons-sur-Marne
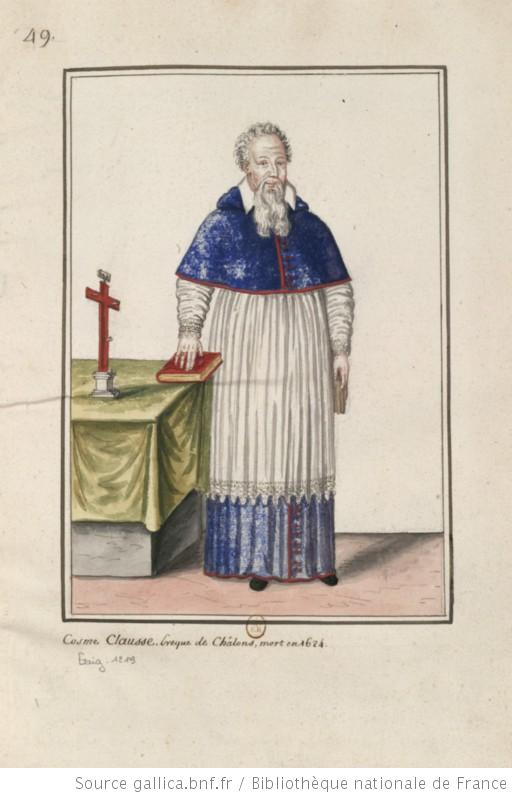
- Church: Catholic Church
- Diocese: Diocese of Châlons-sur-Marne
- In office: 17 November 1574 – 1 April 1624
- Predecessor: Nicolas Clausse de Marchaumont
- Successor: Henri Clausse de Fleury

Orders
- Consecration: 2 February 1575 by Nicolas Psaume

Personal details
- Born: c. 1548
- Died: 1 April 1624

Côme Clausse de Marchaumont (ca. 1548 – 1 April 1624) was a French Roman Catholic prelate. He was bishop of Châlons between 1574 and 1624.

== Biography ==
Côme Clausse de Marchaumont was the fourth son of Côme Clausse and Marie, the sister of bishop Jérôme Burgensis, after whom he became commendatory abbot of Saint-Pierre-aux-Monts Abbey. In 1574, he succeeded his brother Nicolas to the bishopric of Châlons; Nicolas had inherited the title from their mother's brother. Clausse de Marchaumont was consecrated in 1575 by Nicolas Psaume, the bishop of Verdun.

In the course of his half-century-long bishopric, he attended the coronations of Henry III in 1575 and of Louis XIII in 1610. He received Recollects and Jesuits in Châlons in 1613. On 28 April 1608 he became coadjutor bishop to his nephew Henri Clausse de Fleury, who was appointed titular bishop of Auzia in Maghreb (today in northern Algeria).

Marchaumont died on 1 April 1624. His nephew succeeded him to the see of Châlons.
