= Diocese of Châlons =

Catholic diocese in France

Diocese of Châlons Dioecesis Catalaunensis Diocèse de Châlons

Catholic
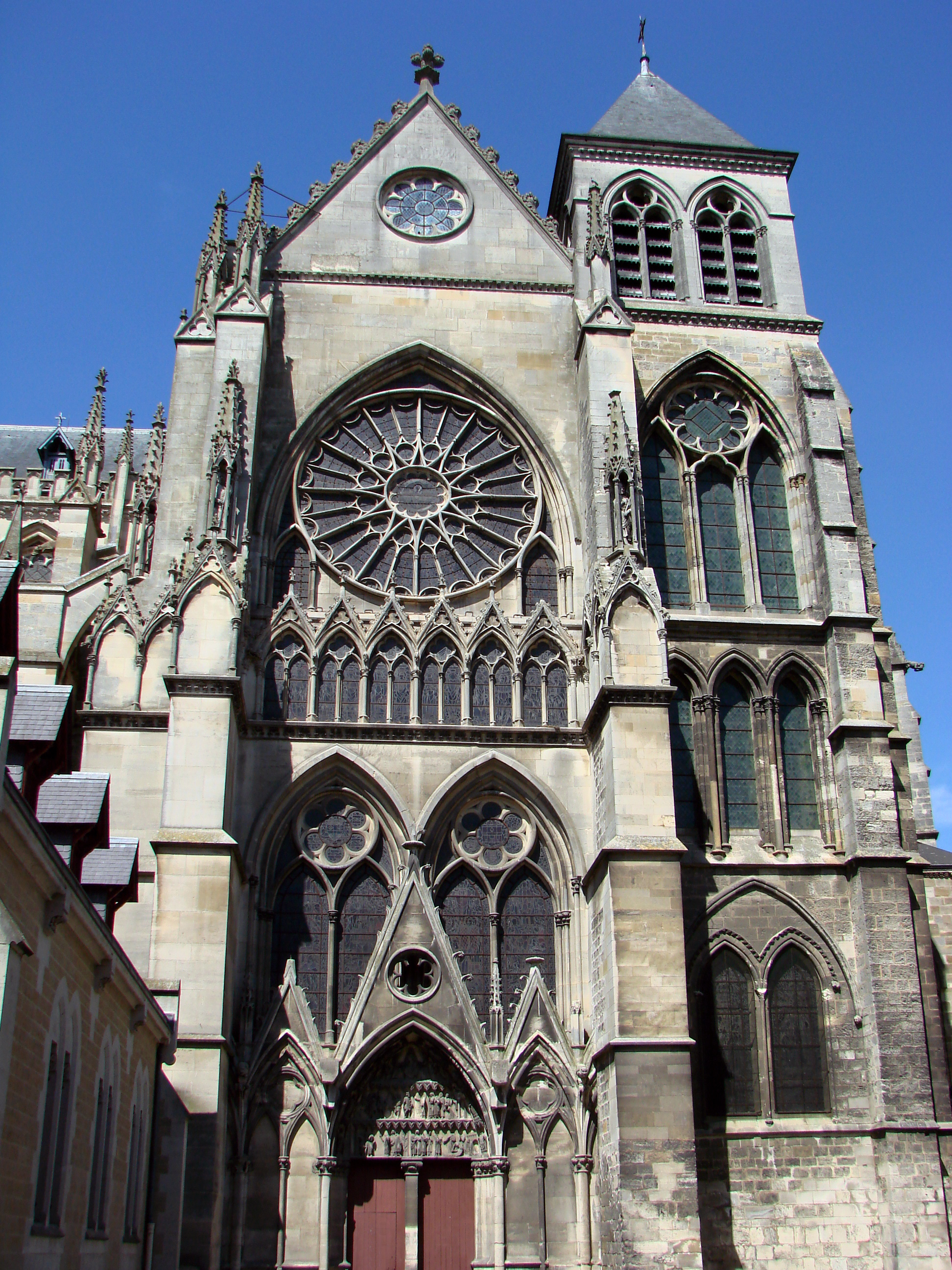
- Châlons Cathedral

Location
- Country: France
- Ecclesiastical province: Reims
- Metropolitan: Archdiocese of Reims
- Coordinates: 48°57′19″N 4°21′28″E

Statistics
- Area: 6,501 km^{2} (2,510 sq mi)
- Population: Total; Catholics: (as of 2021); 280,624; 267,965 (95.5%)
- Parishes: 34

Information
- Denomination: Roman Catholic
- Sui iuris church: Latin Church
- Rite: Roman Rite
- Established: 4th century as Chalons-sur-Marne; 1822 as Châlons
- Cathedral: Cathedral of St. Stephen in Châlons
- Patron saint: Saint Memmius
- Secular priests: 42 (Diocesan); 3 (Religious Orders); 17 Permanent Deacons

Current leadership
- Pope: Leo XIV
- Bishop elect: Franck Javary
- Metropolitan Archbishop: Éric de Moulins-Beaufort
- Bishops emeritus: Gilbert Louis

Map

Website
- Website of the Diocese

The Diocese of Châlons (Latin: Dioecesis Catalaunensis; French: Diocèse de Châlons) is a Latin Church ecclesiastical territory or diocese of the Catholic Church in Châlons-sur-Marne, France. The diocese comprises the department of Marne, excluding the arrondissement of Reims.

The Diocese of Châlons is a suffragan diocese in the ecclesiastical province of the metropolitan Archdiocese of Reims.

In 2021, in the Diocese of Limoges there was one priest for every 5,954 Catholics.

== History ==
Local legends maintain that the evangelization of Châlons by St. Memmius, sent thither by St. Peter and assisted by his sister Poma, also by St. Donatian and St. Domitian, took place in the first century. These legends are not credible, and in the revised list of the diocesan saints in the Breviary (prayer book) these legends have been suppressed.

Louis Duchesne, a prominent scholar of early Christianity in Gaul, assigns the founding of the See of Châlons to the fourth century.

The bishops of Châlons played a part in French history as Peers of France. At the coronation of the Capetian kings, the Bishop of Châlons always carried the royal ring.

=== Cathedral, seminary, college ===
The older cathedral at Châlons had been dedicated to Saint Vincent, up to the time of Charles the Bald. It had become the cathedral under Bishop Felix I, ca. 625, when the older cathedral was abandoned. In 931, and again in 963, the town of Châlons suffered serious fires. In 931 the fire was deliberately set by Rudolph II of Burgundy in reprisal for the support given by Bishop Bovo to Herbert II, Count of Vermandois against him. In 963 it was Herbert III, Count of Vermandois who put the city to the flames because Bishop Gebuin had supported the deposition of Hugh, Herbert II's son, from the archbishopric of Reims. In both cases the cathedral suffered serious damage. In 1138 the cathedral was struck by lightning and mostly destroyed.

The new Cathedral of Saint Stephen was consecrated in 1147 by the exiled Pope Eugene III, assisted by eighteen cardinals, with Bernard of Clairvaux in attendance. In 1253, when he was visiting Rome, Bishop Pierre de Hans was able to obtain what was claimed to be a fragment of the head of Saint Stephen from the abbot of the monastery at Saint Paul Outside the Walls.

The first seminary in Châlons was founded by Bishop Jérome de Burges (or Jérôme Bourgeois) on October 14, 1572, in part of the abandoned Hôpital Saint Lazare, which was thereafter called the Collège S. Lazare. From 1617, the seminarists shared quarters with the Jesuits, and when the Jesuits moved to larger quarters, the seminary followed them. It was only in 1646 that Bishop de Vialar provided them with separate, and inadequate, quarters. Bishop de Clermont-Tonnerre had the church of S. Nicholas demolished and the seminary extended on its foundations.

The Collège de Châlons (Collège S. Lazare) was endowed by Bishop Cosme Clausse on May 30, 1615, and he and the City entered into a contract with the Jesuits to staff the college on February 23, 1617. The Jesuits directed the school until they were expelled from France in 1762, at which point the collège was turned over to laymen and secular clergy until the end of the monarchy in 1791. In 1784 some 245 pupils were being educated there.

=== Benefices ===
The diocese was well supplied with positions which carried income with them. The cathedral had eight dignities: the Dean, the Cantor, the Grand Archdeacon (of Châlons), the Archdeacon of Joinville, the Archdeacon of Astenai, and the Archdeacon of Vertus, the Treasurer, and the Succentor. (Note: The Archdeacons are not attested until the eleventh century.) In addition there were thirty Canons. In 1699 the number of Canons was thirty-nine, while in 1764 the number was thirty-one. There had once been a Provost as well, but the office was abolished by Bishop Roger in 1065, with royal consent. The bishop appointed the four Archdeacons and the Treasurer, while the Dean, the Cantor, and the Succentor were elected by the Chapter of the Cathedral. The Chapter also assigned the prebends, to which the Archdeacons and Treasurer were not entitled.

There were also two Collegiate Churches in the city of Châlons, Saint-Trinité (with ten prebendaries, appointed by the Cathedral Chapter) and Nôtre Dame en Vaux (with twelve prebendaries, appointed by the Cathedral Chapter). Among its abbeys, the diocese counted: St. Memmius (Augustinians), founded in the fifth century by Alpinus; Toussaints (Augustinians), founded in the eleventh century; Châtrices (Augustinians); Montier-en-Der (Benedictines), founded in the seventh century by Bercharius of Hautvillers, a monk from Luxeuil; Saint Urbain, founded in 865; Saint-Pierre au Mont (Benedictines), founded during the same period; Moiremont (Benedictines); Huiron (Benedictines); Saint-Sauveur-de Vertus (Benedictines); Nôtre-Dame de Vertus (Augustinians); Trois-Fontaines (Cistercians); Haute-Fontaine (Cistercians); Cheminon (Cistercians); and Moutier-en-Argonne (Cistercians). The king was the patron and made the appointments at Toussaints, Saint-Pierre, Saint-Memmius, and Châtrices. Nôtre-Dame de l'Epine, near Châlons, was a place of pilgrimage as early as the beginning of the fifteenth century, thanks to the mysterious discovery of a miraculous image of the Virgin Mary.

=== Revolution ===
In 1790 the National Constituent Assembly decided to bring the French church under the control of the State. Civil government of the provinces was to be reorganized into new units called departments, originally intended to be 83 or 84 in number. The dioceses of the Roman Catholic Church were to be reduced in number, to coincide as much as possible with the new departments. Since there were more than 130 bishoprics at the time of the Revolution, more than fifty dioceses needed to be suppressed and their territories consolidated. Clergy would need to take an oath of allegiance to the State and its Constitution, specified by the Civil Constitution of the Clergy, and they would become salaried officials of the State. Both bishops and priests would be elected by special 'electors' in each department. This meant schism, since bishops would no longer need to be approved (preconised) by the Papacy; the transfer of bishops, likewise, which had formerly been the exclusive prerogative of the pope in canon law, would be the privilege of the State; the election of bishops no longer lay with the Cathedral Chapters (which were all abolished), or other responsible clergy, or the Pope, but with electors who did not even have to be Catholics or Christians.

The diocese of Châlons-sur-Marne was one of the dioceses which was suppressed, and its territory was transferred to a new diocese centered at Reims, and called the "Diocese of the Marne". The bishop of Marne would be the Metropolitan of a 'Metropole du Nord-Est', which would include: Marne, Aisne, Ardennes, Meurthe, Moselle, and Nord. The dioceses of Soissons and Troyes were also suppressed and incorporated into the 'Diocèse du Marne'. The Bishops of Reims, Châlons, Soissons and Troyes protested, addressing letters to their clergy and to the 'electors' and warning them to take no account of the activities of the government as regards the Church. In Châlons a large number of the clergy were in favor of reforms. One in four of the curates, and one in five of the vicars, refused to take the oath to the Civil Constitution (or retracted it after they had taken it). This meant that they were discharged from their functions and left without incomes; they became targets of the more radical of the revolutionaries.

In Marne, the 539 electors were invited to assemble by the Constituent Assembly, and 395 of them assembled at Reims in March 1791. They elected François-Nicolas Gangand, the curé of Mareuil-sur-Ay, but he refused. Then, on March 15, they elected Nicolas Diot as Bishop and Metropolitan of Marne, and he thus acquired control over the suppressed diocese of Châlons-sur-Marne. He was consecrated in Paris on May 1, 1791, by Constitutional Bishop Jean-Baptiste Gobel. (Note: Gobel had been consecrated a year earlier by Bishop Charles-Maurice de Talleyrand-Perigord of Autun and two other titular bishops.) The consecration was valid, having been performed in the proper form by three Roman Catholic bishops, but illicit and schismatic, since the election and consecration had taken place without the sanction of Pope Pius VII. Diot acquiesced in new attitudes; he actually presided at the marriage of one of his priests. He survived the Terror (which had abolished Religion and replaced it with Reason), and as late as 1800 he carried out an episcopal consecration (Cambrai) In 1801 he presided at a diocesan synod, and in June 1802 at a Metropolitan synod. He died on December 31, 1802.

=== Church of the Concordat ===
In the meantime First Consul Napoleon Bonaparte was preparing to end the religious confusion in France by entering into a Concordat with the Vatican. He had plans for the future, and he required a united France in order to carry them out successfully. In separate actions both he and Pius VII called on all bishops in France to submit their resignations. On November 29, 1801, by the bull Qui Christi Domini, Pope Pius VII suppressed all of the Roman Catholic dioceses in France, and reinstituted them under papal authority. This act did away with whatever doubt or ambiguity might still exist as to a 'Constitutional Church' and 'Constitutional dioceses' in France. United in 1802 with the Diocese of Meaux and in 1821 with the Archdiocese of Reims, the Diocese of Châlons was re-established in 1822, and is suffragan to the Archdiocese of Reims.

The Concordat of 1801 was unilaterally abrogated by the Law of Separation of Church and State, enacted on December 9, 1905. From that date, the Republic no longer nominated French bishops. The law also declared that all religious buildings were property of the state and local governments, and enacted the prohibition of affixing religious signs on public buildings. Nuns were removed from hospital staffs. Schools were secularized, and religious instruction was forbidden to children between the ages of six and thirteen. The law did not apply to the provinces of Alsace or Lorraine, which were at the time part of the German Empire.

== Bishops ==
=== To 1000 ===
- c. 260–280: St Memmius (Note: Memmius, or Memmie, or Menge)
- St Donatianus (Note: Mentioned only in the Life of Memmius as his successor.)
- St Domitianus
- Amable
- c. 300: Didier
- c. 340: Sanctissimus
- c. 400: Provinctus
- by 411 – before 461: Alpinus (St Alpin) (Note: Alpinus is said to have been a disciple of Lupus of Troyes. He was bishop when Attila the Hun fought the Battle of the Catalaunian Plains (Châlons) in 451, and to have served for forty-seven years.)
- by 461 – 500: Amandinus (Amand) (Note: Bishop Amandinus was present at the Council of Tours on November 18, 461.)
- 500: Florandus (Note: Only his name is known.)
- c. 515: Providerius
- c. 530: Prodictor (or Proditor, Productor)
- 535–541: Lupus (Note: Bishop Lupus attended the Council of Clermont in Auvergne in 541.)
- Papio
- c. 565: Eucharius
- 578: Teutinodus (or Teutmodus)
- c. 579: Elasius (Elaphius) (Note: Elasius died in Spain, where he had been sent on business concerning Queen Brunhilda.)
- attested 614: Leudomerus (Note: Leudomerus took part in the Council of Paris in 614.)
- after 614 – after 627: Felix (Note: Felix was present at the Council of Clichy on September 27, 627.)
- Ragnebaud
- c. 660: Landebert
- c. 685: Arnoul (I).
- 693: Bertoinus (Note: Bishop Bertoinus confirmed the privileges of two abbeys on 15 February 692/693, year 2 of King Clovis IV.)
- Felix (II)
- Bladald
- Scaricus
- c. 770: Ricaire
- 770–784: Willibald
- 784–804: Bovo (Note: Duchesne assigns Bovo the dates c. 782–802.)
- c. 804–827: Hildegrim of Châlons (Note: Hildigrimus died on June 20, 827. The episcopal catalogues state that he governed the diocese of Châlons for twenty-five years, making his accession date c. 802.)
- 810–835: Adelelmus
- 835–857: Lupus (II) (Note: Bishop Lupus participated in the Council of Soissons in April 853.)
- 857–868: Erchenrad (Note: Charles the Bald ratified an exchange of property between Bishop Erchenrad and one Gotbert on September 27, 868.)
- 868–878: Willibert (Note: Willebertus was consecrated on December 5, 868, and died on January 2, 878. He was present at the Council of Ponthion in July 876.)
- 878–887: Berno
- 887–894: Rodoaldus
- 894–908: Mancio
- c. 908–912: Letoldus (Note: Letoldus is known from a subscription at the Council of Trosley in 909.)
- c. 912–947: Bovo (II).
- c. 947–998: Gibuin (I).
- 998–1004: Gibuin (II).

=== 1000–1300 ===
- 1004–1008: Guido (Guy) (Note: His name appears as Wido in the subscriptions from the Council of Chelles on May 17, 1008.)
- 1008–1042: Roger I
- 1042–1066: Roger II (Note: The bishop signs himself as "Rotgerus episcopus secundus".)
- 1066–1093: Roger de Hainaut (Note: Also referred to as Roger (III).)
- 1093–1100: Philippe de Champagne (House of Blois)
- 1100–1113: Hugues
- 1113–1121: William of Champeaux
- 1122–1127: Ebalus de Roucy (Note: In 1123, Ebalus helped negotiate a peace between Pope Calixtus II and the Emperor Henry V.)
- 1127–1130: Erlebertus (Note: On the death of Bishop Ebalus, Alberic, rector of the school of Reims, was elected bishop. Bernard of Clairvaux wrote a testimonial letter to Pope Honorius II on his behalf, but the election was not approved. In 1137 Alberic was elected Bishop of Bourges. Erlebertus is attested in 1128, 1129 and 1130.)
- 1131–1142: Geoffroy (I)
- 1142–1147: Guy II de Pierrepont
- 1147–1152: Barthélémy de Senlis
- 1152–1153: Aymon (Haymo)
- 1153–1162: Boso
- 1164–1190: Guy (III) de Joinville (Note: Guy was the son of Roger de Joigny, Sire de Joinville. Pope Alexander III wrote a letter from Paris to Bishop-elect Guy de Joinville on February 10, 1063, ordering to have Geoffroy de Joinville restore some property to the Church of Reims. Guy died on January 31, 1190.)
- 1190–1201: Rotrou du Perche (Note: Rotrocus (Rotrou) had been treasurer of the Basilica of Saint Martin, Tours and Archdeacon of Reims. He died on December 10, 1201.)
- 1200–1215: Gérard de Douai (Note: Bishop Gerard resigned in 1215. The Archdeacon Frederick was elected to succeed him, but after one day he too resigned.)
- 1215–1226: William II, Count of Perche (Note: William was the younger brother of Bishop Rotrou du Perche. He had been archdeacon and then treasurer of Brussels. In 1203 he became provost of Calestria in the diocese of Tours. He was then provost of Chartres, and subsequently chancellor. He died on February 12 or 18, 1226.)
- 1226–1228: vacant (Note: During the sede vacante several attempts at an election of a bishop were made. Henri, Archdeacon of Reims and Treasurer of Beauvais, was elected, but declined. Master Pierre de Collemedio was then elected, but he also refused. Discord accompanied a third attempt, at which the majority settled on Bartolomeo the Lombard, a Canon and Theologus of Châlons; but a minority put forth the brother of the Bishop of Verdun, Robert de Torota, and indicated that if he were unacceptable, they would support Canon Hugh, the Cantor of the Cathedral Chapter.)
- 1228–1237: Philippe de Nemours (Note: According to the Gallia Christiana, Méréville is not Philippe's correct name; de Nemours is. This judgment is followed by Eubel. He was the son of Ursus, Lord of Bercy and Royal Chamberlain. Philippe had three uncles who were also bishops, those of Paris (Pierre), Noyon (Étienne), and Meaux (Guillaume). Philippe had been Dean of Paris (1227–1228). He was present at the provincial Council of Reims in 1235. He died on Palm Sunday, April 8, 1237. On his deanship, see Fisquet.)
- 1241–1247: Geoffroy de Grandpré (Note: Geoffrey became involved in a contested election, in which his competitor had more votes than he (18–14); the matter was submitted to Pope Gregory IX, who quashed the election of the competitor, a canon of Reims. Geoffroy was "bishop elect" in documents of 1237, 1238, and 1239, and perhaps 1242. He was granted his bulls on April 15, 1241, four months before the Pope died. Geoffroy died on April 22, 1247.)
- 1248–1261: Pierre (I) de Hans (Note: Pierre de Hans had been Archdeacon of Chalons. His election was approved by Pope Innocent IV on February 15, 1248. The Pope also wrote to King Louis IX gently warning the king that he should not injure the Church of Châlons under the guise of jura regalia. Bishop Pierre died on November 16, 1261.)
- 1262–1269: Conon de Vitry (Note: Conon served as bishop for six years, 1263–1269.)
- 1269–1272: vacant (Note: During the vacancy, the administration was in the hands of the King, per jura regalia, the Bishop of Chalons being a Count and a Peer of France. Since there was no pope during the papal sede vacante of 1268–1272, there was no pope to issue bulls of consecration or installation.)
- 1272–1273: Arnoul (II) (Note: Arnulfus was the son of Arnold IV, Count of Loon, and was provost of Cologne. He was provided (appointed) by Pope Gregory X on September 4, 1272, after a contested election. He died on July 30, 1273.)
- 1273–1284: Rémi de Somme-Tourbe (Note: Remigius died on October 10, 1284.)
- 1285–1313: Jean (I) de Châteauvillain (Note: News of Jean's election by the cathedral chapter was sent to Pope Martin IV, who died on March 28, 1285, before the appropriate bulls could be issued. It was Honorius IV who gave his approval on April 24, 1285. Châteauvillain died on April 2, 1313.)

=== 1300–1500 ===
- 1313–1328: Pierre de Latilly (Note: Pierre de Latilly was approved by Pope Clement V on May 13, 1313. He died on March 15, 1328.)
- 1328–1335: Simon de Châteauvillain (Note: Simon, a canon of Langres, was appointed by Pope John XXII on April 6, 1328. He died on January 8, 1335.)
- 1335–1339: Philippe (III) de Melun (Note: Philippe de Melun, the son of Viscount Adam de Melun, had been a canon of Paris and of Sens, and archdeacon of Reims. He was approved by Benedict XII on May 15, 1335, and on May 17 granted the privilege of receiving ordination to the priesthood from any bishop he wished. He was transferred to the Diocese of Sens on February 15, 1339, which he resigned in October 1344.)
- 1339: Jean (II) de Mandevillain (Note: Jean de Mandevillain had previously been Bishop of Nevers (1333–1334) and Bishop of Arras (1334–1339). He was granted his bulls for Châlons by Benedict XII on February 15, 1339 He was entered in the book of Obligations on March 6 for 4,000 gold florins. Mandevillain died on November 27, 1339.)
- 1340–1351: Jean (III) Happe
- 1352–1356: Regnaud Chauveau (Note: Reginaldus had previously been dean of the Chapter of Brugge in the diocese of Tournai, and then Bishop of Châlons-sur-Saône (1351–1353). He was elected Bishop of Châlons-sur-Marne on February 25, 1352, and approved by Innocent VI on October 2, 1353. He took his oath of obedience to his Metropolitan, the Archbishop of Reims, on September 30, 1354. He died on September 19, 1356.)
- 1357–1389: Archambaud de Lautrec (Note: Archambaud was the son of Amalric III, Viscount of Lautrec and Marguerite de Périgueux. Archambaud had previously been a canon of Paris, and then Bishop of Lavaur (1348–1357). He was appointed Bishop of Châlons by Pope Innocent VI on January 11, 1357. He died on November 10, 1389.)
- 1389–1413: Charles de Poitiers (Avignon obedience) (Note: Charles' brother Jean was Bishop of Valence and Die (1390–1447). Charles was appointed by Clement VII on January 29, 1390. He was transferred to the Diocese of Langres on September 20, 1413. He died in 1433.)
- 1413–1420: Louis of Bar (administrator) (Note: Louis of Bar, suburbicarian Bishop of Porto, was named by Antipope John XXIII.)
- 1420–1438: Jean (IV) de Sarrebruck (Note: Jean de Sarrebruck was the son of Jean III de Sarrebruck-Commercy and Elisabeth de Joinville. He had been Bishop of Verdun (1404–1420), by appointment of Antipope Benedict XIII. Johann was transferred from Verdun and appointed Bishop of Châlons by Pope Martin V personally. When he left Verdun in 1420, Louis of Bar became administrator of the diocese, on January 10, 1420. Jean died on November 30, 1438.)
- 1439: Jean (V) Tudert (Note: Tudert, a canon of Paris, was approved on April 22, 1439. He died on December 9, 1439, before he could be consecrated.)
- 1440–1453: Guillaume (III) le Tur (Note: Guillaume was Doctor Legum (Civil and Canon Law). He was elected on March 4, 1440, and received papal approval on July 6. He died on June 3, 1453.)
- 1453–1503: Geoffroy (III) Soreau (or Geoffroy Floreau) (Note: The cathedral chapter elected the Archdeacon Ambrosius de Camarata, but the election was quashed by Pope Nicholas V, who transferred Geoffroy from the Diocese of Nîmes. His bulls were issued on November 27, 1453. He made his solemn entry into Châlons on September 1, 1454. He built the episcopal palace. He died on February 10, 1503.)

=== 1500–1700 ===
- 1504–1535: Gilles de Luxembourg (Note: Gilles (Aegidius) was the illegitimate son of Louis, Count of Saint-Pol, and had been dean of the cathedral chapter of Châlons. He was approved by Pope Julius II on November 29, 1503. On January 1, 1504, he took his oath of allegiance to King Louis XII at Lyon. As a Peer of France, he took part in the coronation of Francis I on January 25, 1515. He died on February 10, 1535.)
- 1535–1549: Robert de Lenoncourt
- 1550–1556: Philippe de Lenoncourt (Note: Philippe was the nephew of Bishop Robert de Lenoncourt. He was transferred to the diocese of Auxerre on February 7, 1560. He was named a cardinal by Pope Sixtus V on November 16, 1586.)}
- 1556–1571: Jérôme de Burges (or Jérôme Bourgeois) (Note: Jérôme's father was chief physician to Francis I, thanks to whose patronage he became canon of Chartres and royal Aumonier, as well as abbot commendatory of Saint Peter's in Châlons. He was preconised (approved) by Pope Paul IV on April 13, 1556.)
- 1571–1573: Nicolas Clausse de Marchamont
- 1575–1624: Cosme Clausse de Marchamont (Note: Cosmas was the brother of Nicolas Clausse, his predecessor.)
- 1624–1640: Henri Clausse de Fleury (Note: Henri Clausse was appointed co-adjutor to Bishop Cosme Clausse, his uncle, on April 28, 1608, and succeeded upon the death of Cosme on April 1, 1624. He died on December 13, 1640.)
- 1642–1680: Félix Vialar de Herse (Note: Vialar, who was a doctor of theology, was nominated by King Louis XIII in December 1640, but did not receive his bulls until May 26, 1642. He died on June 11, 1680.)
- 1681–1695: Louis-Antoine de Noailles (Note: Louis-Antoine de Noailles had been Bishop of Cahors (1679–1681). He was nominated by King Louis XIV on June 21, 1680, and preconised (approved) by Pope Innocent XI on March 17, 1681. He was transferred to the Diocese of Paris on September 19, 1695, and created a cardinal by Pope Innocent XII on June 21, 1700. He refused to accept the Bull Unigenitus of Pope Clement XI (September 8, 1713), and was excommunicated as a schismatic by the Bull Pastoralis officii of August 28, 1718. He died on May 4, 1729, having recanted in 1728.)
- 1696–1720: Jean-Baptiste-Louis-Gaston de Noailles (Note: Jean-Baptiste-Louis-Gaston de Noailles was the nephew of Louis-Antoine. He was nominated Bishop of Châlons by Louis XIV on December 24, 1695, and preconised (approved) by Pope Innocent XII on April 2, 1696. He died on September 15, 1720.)

=== 1700–1900 ===
- 1721–1733: Nicolas-Charles de Saulx-Tavannes (Note: Saulx-Tavannes was nominated on January 1, 1721, and was approved by Pope Innocent XIII on September 24, 1721. He was consecrated in Paris by Cardinal Fleury on November 9, 1721. He was promoted to the See of Rouen on December 18, 1733, and named a cardinal on April 5, 1756, by Pope Benedict XIV. He died in Paris on March 10, 1759.)
- 1733–1763: Claude-Antoine de Choiseul-Beaupré (Note: Choiseul-Beaupré was nominated bishop of Châlons by King Louis XV on August 28, 1733, and approved (preconised) by Pope Clement XII on December 18, 1733. He died on October 2, 1763.)
- [Antoine de Lastic ( December 19–23, 1763)] (Note: Lastic, the Bishop of Comminges, was nominated by King Louis XV on November 16, 1763, and preconised by Pope Clement XIII on December 19, 1763. Lastic died on December 23, 1763, without having received his bulls and without having been instituted. It is not known whether he took his oath to the King and received his temporalities.)
- 1764–1782: Antoine-Eléonore-Léon Le Clerc de Juigné de Neuchelles (Note: Le Clerc was later named Archbishop of Paris on February 25, 1782.)
- 1782–1801: Anne-Antoine-Jules de Clermont-Tonnerre (Note: Clermont-Tonnerre was nominated to the diocese of Châlons on December 23, 1781, and approved by Pope Pius VI on February 25, 1782. He was consecrated a bishop on April 14. He resigned the diocese in 1801, in compliance with the express wish of Pope Pius VII. On the restoration of Louis XVIII, he was named a Peer of France. In 1817 he was renamed Bishop of Châlons, and the Pope approved, but he was unable to take possession, due to the failure of the French Parliament to ratify the Concordat of 11 June 1817 between France and the Papacy. He was later named Archbishop of Toulouse, on August 28, 1820, and created a cardinal on December 2, 1822. He died in Toulouse on February 21, 1830.)
- 1790–1824: Diocese suppressed
- 1824–1860: Marie-Joseph-François-Victor Monyer de Prilly (Note: Prilly was nominated on April 7, 1823, by King Louis XVIII and preconised (approved) by Pope Pius VII on November 18. He was consecrated a bishop at Saint-Sulpice in Paris on January 18, 1824, by Archbishop Frayssinous. He made his solemn entry into Châlons on January 31. He died on January 1, 1860.)
- 1860–1864: Jean-Honoré Bara
- 1864–1882: Guillaume-René Meignan (later Bishop of Arras)
- 1882–1894: Guillaume-Marie-Romain Sourrieu (later Archbishop of Rouen)
- 1894–1907: Gaspard-Marie-Michel-André Latty (Note: He was named Archbishop of Avignon on December 19, 1907.)

=== From 1900 ===
- 1908–1912: Hector-Irénée Sévin (Note: later Archbishop of Lyon)
- 1912–1948: Joseph-Marie Tissier
- 1948–1973: René-Joseph Piérard
- 1973–1998: Lucien-Emile Bardonne
- 1999–2015: Gilbert Louis
- 2015–2023 : François Touvet
- January 9, 2025 (appointed)— : Franck Javary

== See also ==
- Catholic Church in France
