= Nicolas Clausse de Marchaumont =

French catholic priest

- Bishop of Châlons-sur-Marne
- Church: Catholic Church
- Diocese: Diocese of Châlons-sur-Marne
- In office: 26 November 1571 – 12 September 1573
- Predecessor: Jérôme Burgensis
- Successor: Côme Clausse de Marchaumont

Orders
- Consecration: 11 May 1572 by Charles, Cardinal of Lorraine

Personal details
- Born: c. 1545
- Died: 12 September 1573

Nicolas Clausse de Marchaumont (c. 1545 – 12 September 1573) was a French Roman Catholic prelate. He was bishop of Châlons between 1571 and 1573.

He was the third son of Côme Clausse and Marie, the sister of bishop Jérôme Burgensis. In 1571, Burgensis resigned from bishopric; Marchaumont succeeded him. He was consecrated by Cardinal Charles of Lorraine.

Marchaumont died on 12 September 1573, at the age of 28 after a one-year, one-month and fifteen-days-long bishopric. Then the title was given to his younger brother Côme Clausse de Marchaumont.
