= Pierre de Latilly =

French jurist (died 1328)

Pierre de Latilly (died 15 March 1328) was a 14th-century lawyer, Bishop of Chalons, and Chancellor of France.

== Biography ==
Pierre de Latilly was born in Latilly in an unknown year. A lawyer by training, he became a clerk and devoted his career to the service of royalty. At the same time, he was also a canon in Soissons from 1292 to 1294 and finally, in Paris. In 1290, Latilly served as tax collector of Gisors and Senlis. He was assigned as a tax collector to Languedoc in 1297. For his intractability regarding taxing the poor, Latilly became a reviled figure.

From 1305 onwards, he carried out several diplomatic missions for King Philip IV "the Fair". Among other things, Latilly discussed the destruction of the Templars with Pope Clement V, was sent three times to England, and attempted to strengthen the ties with Henry VII, King of the Romans. In 1307, he held the position of treasurer of Angers. A discreet but influential figure in the King's entourage, Latilly was undoubtedly his main advisor on tax matters.

In 1313, Latilly was appointed Chancellor of France in place of the recently deceased Guillaume de Nogaret. A few months later, he became Bishop of Chalons, a town of which he was already Archdeacon. This seat allowed him to become an ecclesiastical peer of France.

On the death of Philip IV in 1314, Pierre de Latilly was dismissed as Chancellor by King Louis X and the statesman Count Charles of Valois, with the office of Chancellor going to the Count of Valois' own personal Chancellor Éttiene de Mornay and Latilly being arrested of charges of having poisoned his predecessor at the episcopal see of Chalons, Jean de Châteauvillain and King Philip IV with witchcraft.

The death of his sworn enemy Louis X in 1316 got Latilly out of trouble. Given a fair trial in 1317, he was absolved and allowed to regain his episcopal seat. In 1322, he was even granted sums of money the crown owed him for his time as Chancellor by King Charles IV.

Pierre de Latilly died in 1328, a few weeks after King Charles IV. His tombstone can be seen at Chalons Cathedral.
