= Henri Clausse de Fleury =

17th century Roman Catholic bishop

- Bishop of Châlons-sur-Marne
- Church: Catholic Church
- Diocese: Diocese of Châlons-sur-Marne
- In office: 1 April 1624 – 13 December 1640
- Predecessor: Côme Clausse de Marchaumont
- Successor: Félix Vialart de Herse
- Previous posts: Titular Bishop of Auzia (1608-1624); Coadjutor Bishop of Châlons-sur-Marne (1608-1624)

Orders
- Consecration: 16 August 1615 by Henri de Gondi

Personal details
- Died: 13 December 1640

Henri Clausse de Fleury (died on 13 December 1640) was a French Roman Catholic prelate. He was a coadjutor bishop in 1608, then titular bishop of Auria from 1615 and then bishop of Châlons from 1624 to 1640.

== Biography ==
Henri Clausse de Fleury was the second son of Henri Clausse, lord of Fleury-en-Bière and La Chapelle-la-Reine, and of Denise de Neufville, daughter of Nicolas III of Neufville of Villeroy. He is the nephew of Nicolas Clausse de Marchaumont and of his brother Côme Clausse de Marchaumont, who was bishop of Châlons between 1571 and 1624.

On 26 April 1608, he was appointed coadjutor to his uncle Côme; on the same day he was appointed titular bishop of Auria in Maghreb (now in northern Algeria) and consecrated on 16 August 1615 by Henri de Gondi, the Archbishop of Paris. Then he succeeded his uncle Côme to the see of Châlons from 1 April 1624 to 13 December 1640.

Since Archbishop of Reims Henry II of Guise had never been ordained to priesthood, Henri Clausse was suffragan bishop in charge of the administration of the Archdiocese of Reims during several years.
