= L'Épine, Marne =

L'Épine
- Commune
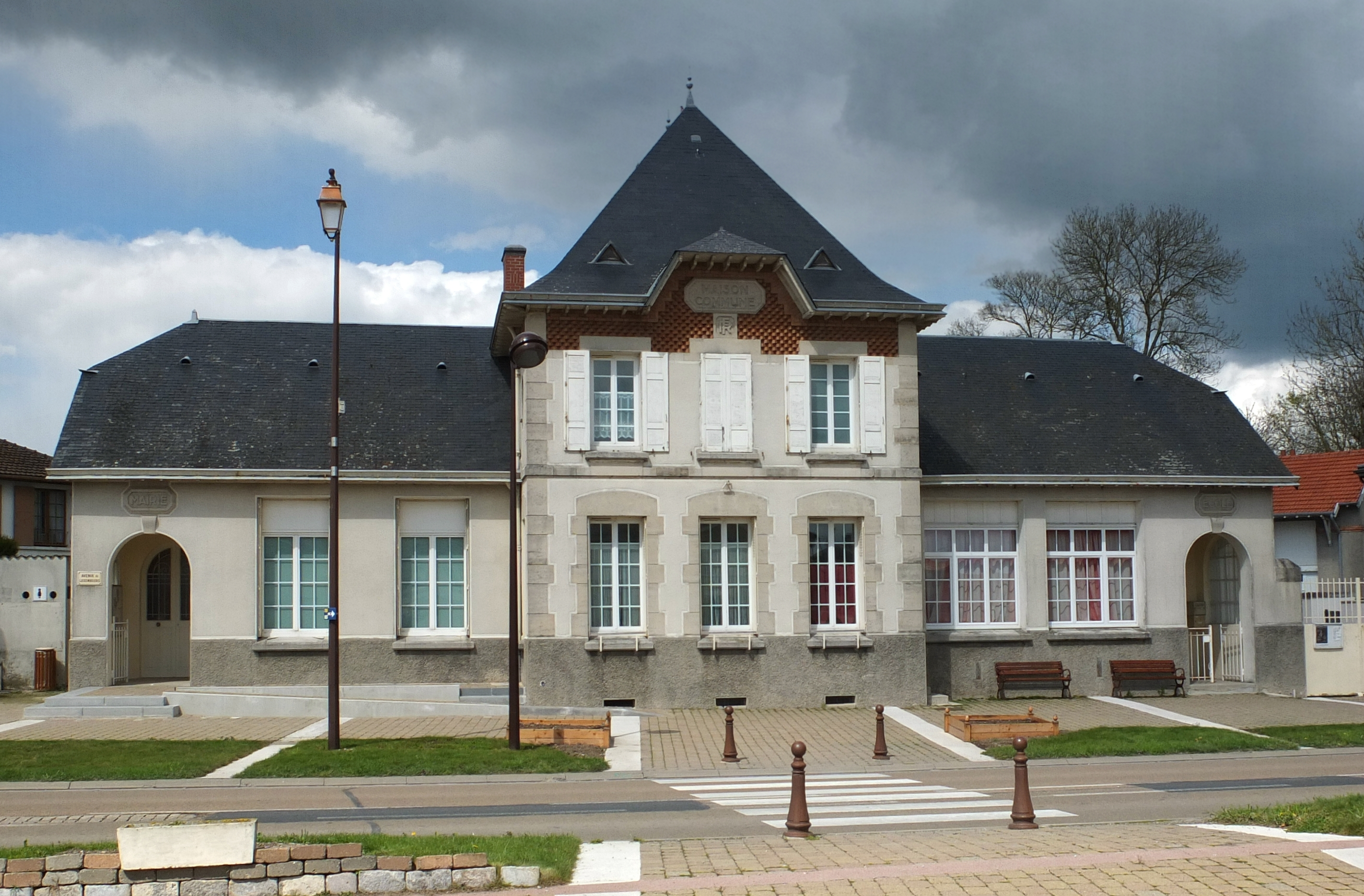
- Town hall
- Location of L'Épine
- Location within France Location within Grand Est
- Coordinates: 48°58′39″N 4°28′15″E
- Country: France
- Region: Grand Est
- Department: Marne
- Arrondissement: Châlons-en-Champagne
- Canton: Châlons-en-Champagne-3
- Intercommunality: CA Châlons-en-Champagne

Government
  - Mayor (2020–2026): Jean-Pierre Adam
- Area^{1}: 30.51 km^{2} (11.78 sq mi)
- Elevation: 156 m (512 ft)
- Highest elevation: 171 m (561 ft)
- Lowest elevation: 100 m (330 ft)
- Population (2023): 685
  - Density: 22.5/km^{2} (58.1/sq mi)
- Time zone: UTC+01:00 (CET)
  - Summer (DST): UTC+02:00 (CEST)
- INSEE/Postal code: 51231 /51460
- ^{1} French Land Register data, which excludes lakes, ponds, glaciers > 1 km^{2} (0.386 sq mi or 247 acres) and river estuaries.

L'Épine (French pronunciation: [lepin]) is a commune in the Marne department in the Grand Est region of north-eastern France.

It is located 8 km (5.0 mi) east of Châlons-en-Champagne and about 45 km (28 mi) south-east of Reims, on the route nationale N3.

== See also ==
- Notre-Dame de l'Épine
- Communes of the Marne department
