= Saint Memmius =

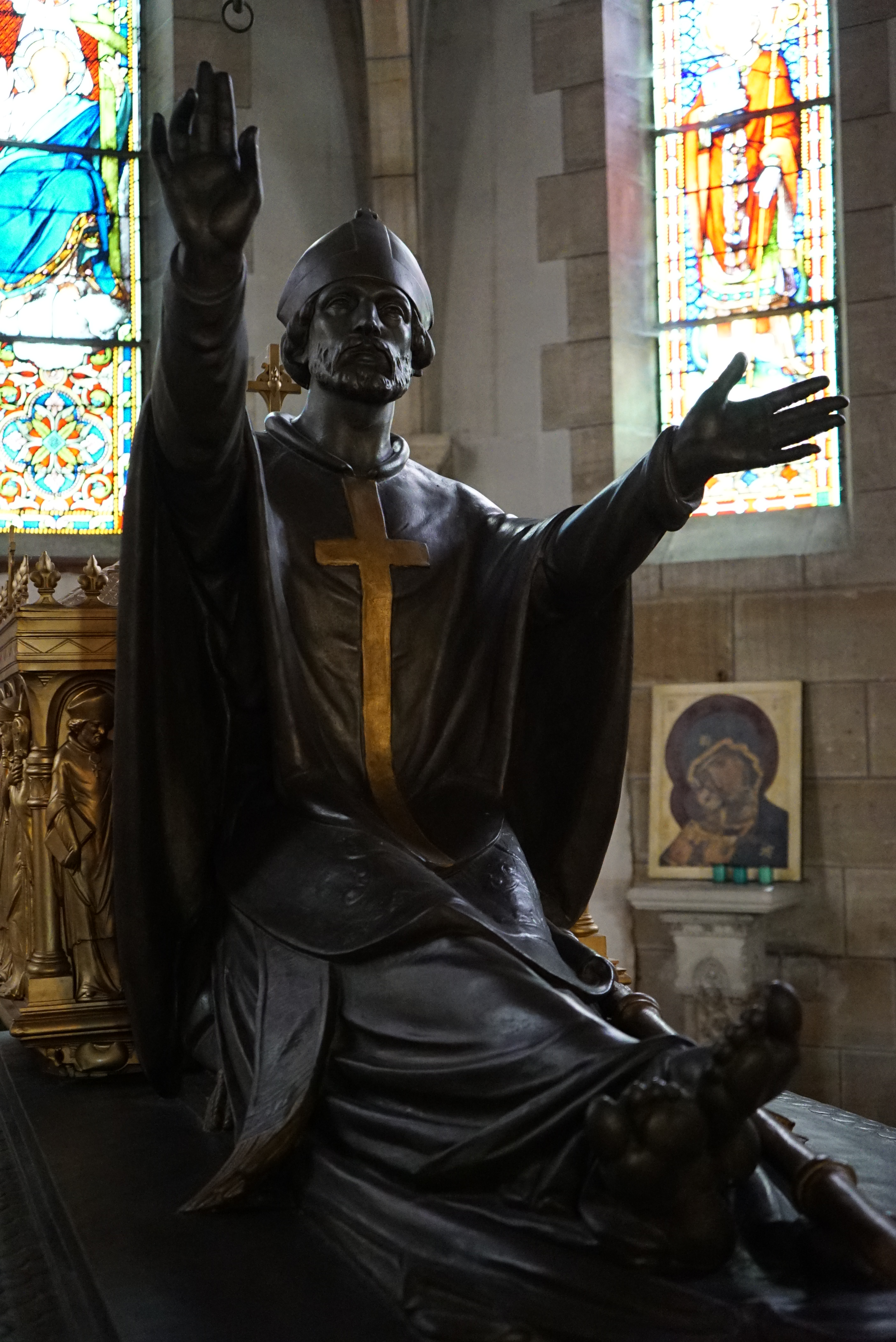

Bishop
- Died: ~300 AD
- Venerated in: Roman Catholic Church
- Feast: 5 August

Saint Memmius (French: Menge, Meinge, Memmie) is venerated as the first bishop of Châlons-sur-Marne (now Châlons-en-Champagne), and founder of the diocese. According to tradition, Memmius was a Roman citizen who was consecrated by Saint Peter and sent to Gaul to convert the people there to Christianity.

However, according to Flodoard, he was a contemporary of Saint Sixtus, bishop of Reims. Memmius' sister, Saint Poma, is also venerated as a saint.

== Veneration ==
Saint Gregory of Tours writes that while traveling through Châlons, his servant fell sick from fever. Gregory prayed at Memmius' tomb and by the next morning Gregory's servant had been cured. Memmius' immediate successors, Donatian and Domitian, were also venerated as saints.
