= Châlons Cathedral =

French cathedral

- Cathédrale Saint-Étienne de Châlons
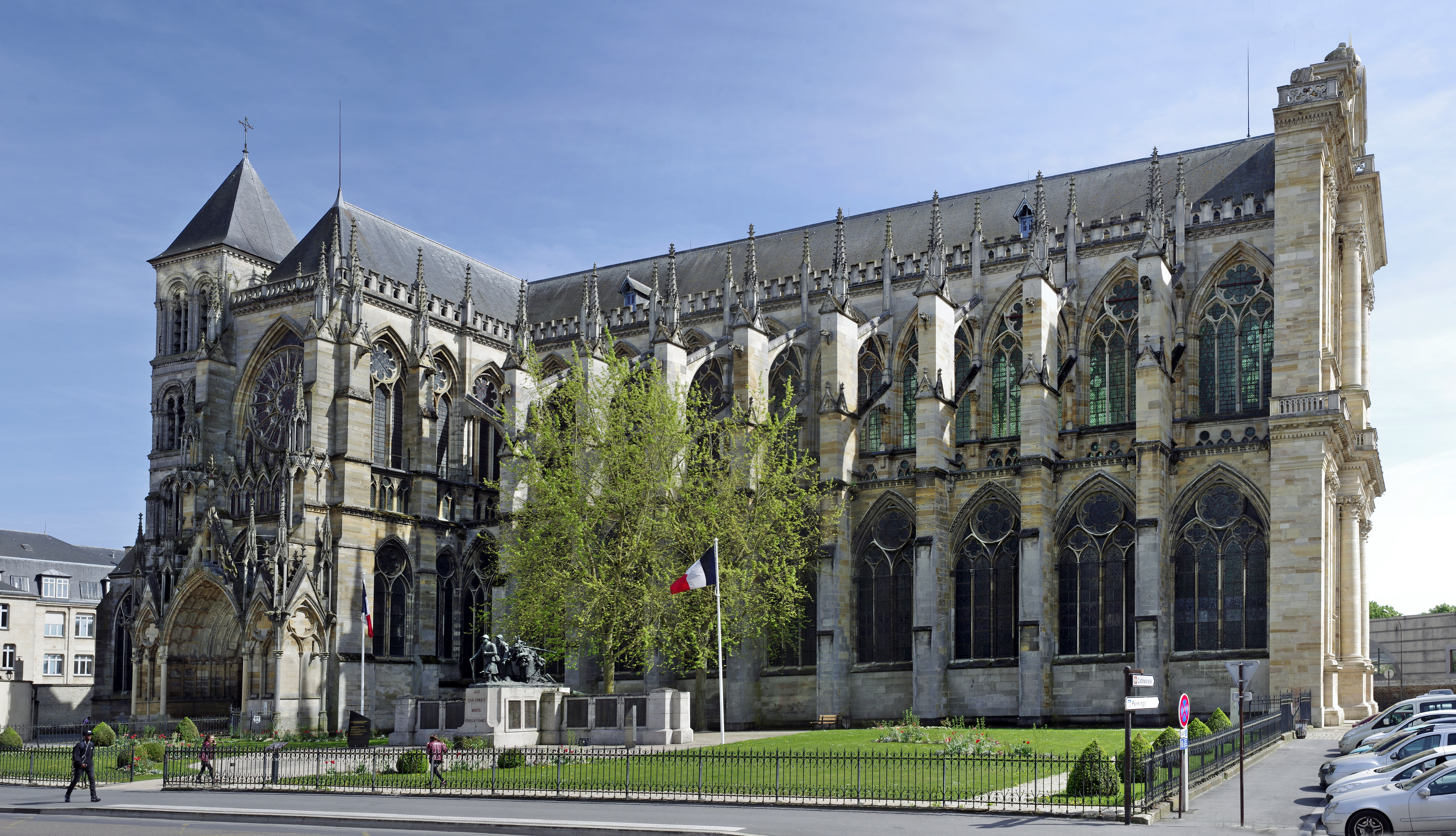
- Châlons Cathedral in 2018

- Location within France

Religion
- Affiliation: Roman Catholic Church
- Rite: Roman
- Ecclesiastical or organisational status: Cathedral

Location
- Location: Châlons-en-Champagne, France
- Municipality: Chalons
- Coordinates: 48°57′19″N 4°21′28″E

Architecture
- Type: Church
- Style: Late Gothic (Flamboyant)

Monument historique
- Official name: Cathédrale Saint-Étienne de Châlons
- Type: Classé
- Designated: 1862
- Reference no.: PA00078610

Châlons Cathedral (French: Cathédrale Saint-Étienne de Châlons) is a Roman Catholic church in Châlons-en-Champagne, France, formerly known as Châlons-sur-Marne. Constructed between 1120 and 1635, Châlons Cathedral is considered to be one of the earliest true Gothic cathedrals built in France and has been listed as a Monument historique since 1862.

== History ==
After the diocese of Châlons was founded in the 4th century, a cathedral was erected in the middle of the fortified Gallo-Roman town, surrounded by a cathedral quarter comprising several churches, the canons' cloister to the north, and the bishop's palace to the west. After being severely damaged by the sacking and burning of the town by Robert of Vermandois and the Normans, a complete reconstruction was ordered around 1120 by William of Champeaux. The structure was completed in about a hundred years, despite the shortage of resources. This new Romanesque cathedral comprised a crypt dedicated to Virgin Mary, a transept, and a long nave, but lacked a true ambulatory. Of the two towers grafted onto the transept arms, only the north tower remains, comparable to the towers of Notre-Dame-en-Vaux. Destroyed halfway through construction in 1138 by fire from a lightning strike, the recovering cathedral was nevertheless consecrated by Pope Eugene III on October 26, 1147.

A third fire significantly damaged the church in 1230, requiring extensive reconstruction. At the same time, the architects of the cathedral were quickly influenced by the new Gothic stylistic advancements of projects such as Saint-Denis Basilica and Noyon Cathedral and swiftly adopted the new Rayonnant Gothic style. The resulting abandonment of Romanesque architecture led to the addition of light filled radiating chapels, chevet, and a ambulatory being added between 1280 and 1310. In addition, stained glass windows, donated by Louis IX were installed in the nave and flying buttresses were also added to further support the growing structure. Construction continued at a relatively slow pace, with the nave being constructed at the end of the 15th century and extending into the 16th century. In response to the restorations of Notre-Dame de l'Épine and Notre-Dame-en-Vaux, a crown with a spire measuring more than 80m tall was added in 1520. Between 1628 and 1634 under architect Claude Monnart, the main façade was completed in the prevailing Baroque style, inspired by the church of Saint-Gervais-Saint-Protais in Paris. However, the original medieval design of the nave was preserved. In 1668, lightning struck the spire of the north tower, causing a fire that inflicted severe damage to the cathedral and completely destroying the choir. The entire apse was reconstructed and the transept towers were finished with stone spires. In addition, to strengthen the pillars, two thirds of the crypt were then filled in for support.

The cathedral suffered severe damage during the French Revolution, with many of the original statues on the façade being destroyed. After being closed, the building was used as a horse stable before being restored in the 19th century by Eugène Viollet-le-Duc's students, particularly his son-in-law Maurice Ouradou. Work included the suppression of the side chapels, deemed inconsistent with the pedestal style; the demolition of the spires on the choir towers erected after the fire of 1668; and the reconstruction of the southern façade of the transept. Restorations also included the cleaning and the addition of new stained glass panels by Jacques Grüber. The cathedral survived almost unscathed through World War I and II, and was reopened in 2009 after a brief restoration.

== Organ ==
The organ was rebuilt and enlarged in 1898 by his sons Eugène and John-Albert, who delivered the largest instrument to come out of their workshop. After work by Max and André Roethinger in 1957, the organs were restored between 2000 and 2006 in the spirit (composition and harmonization) of 1898 by the Renault-Menoret company, then by Olivier Robert and Denis Lacorre.

The choir organ is by Merklin. They have both been classified as a Historic Monument since 2 July 1979.

== Gallery ==
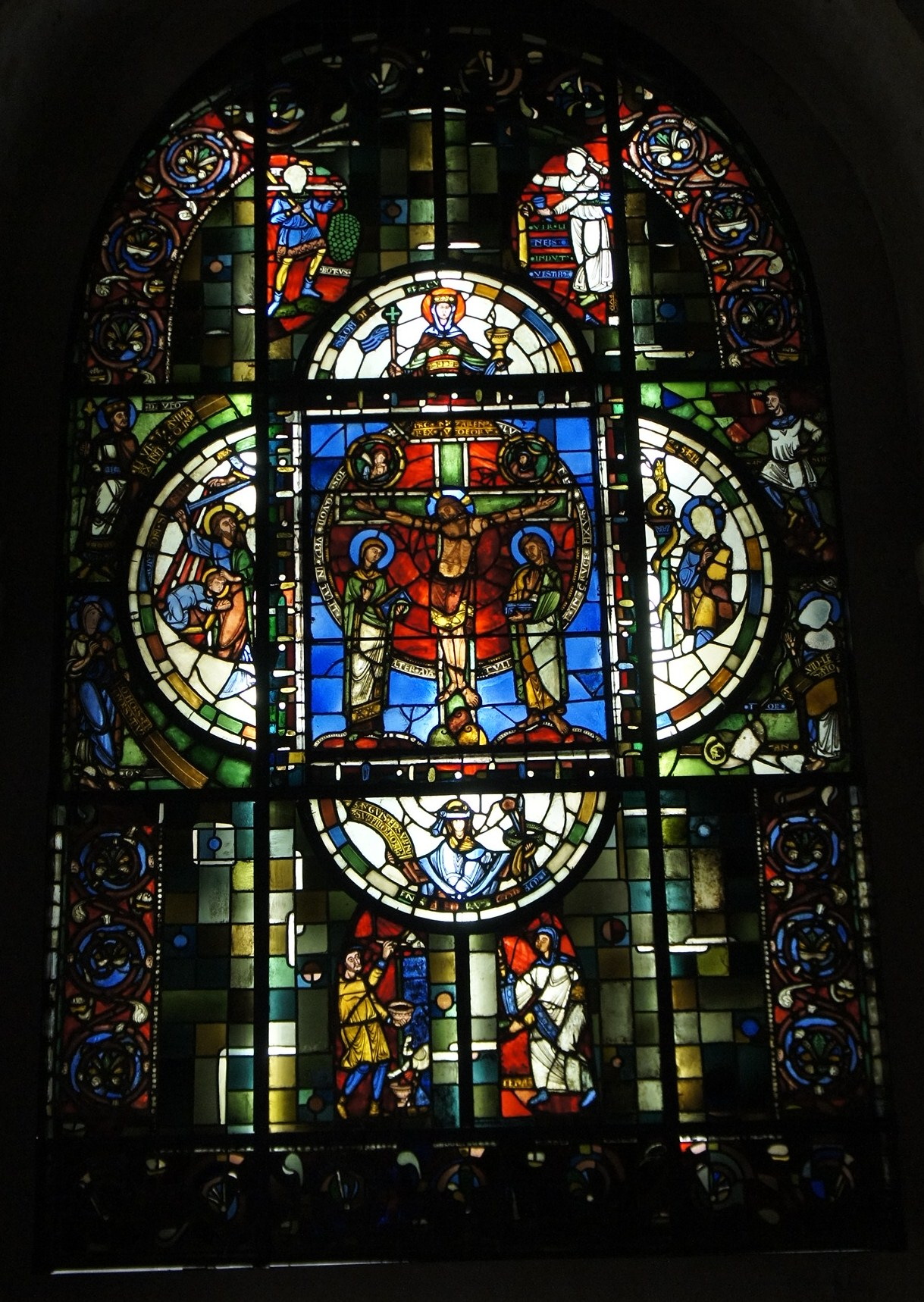
12th-century stained glass windows

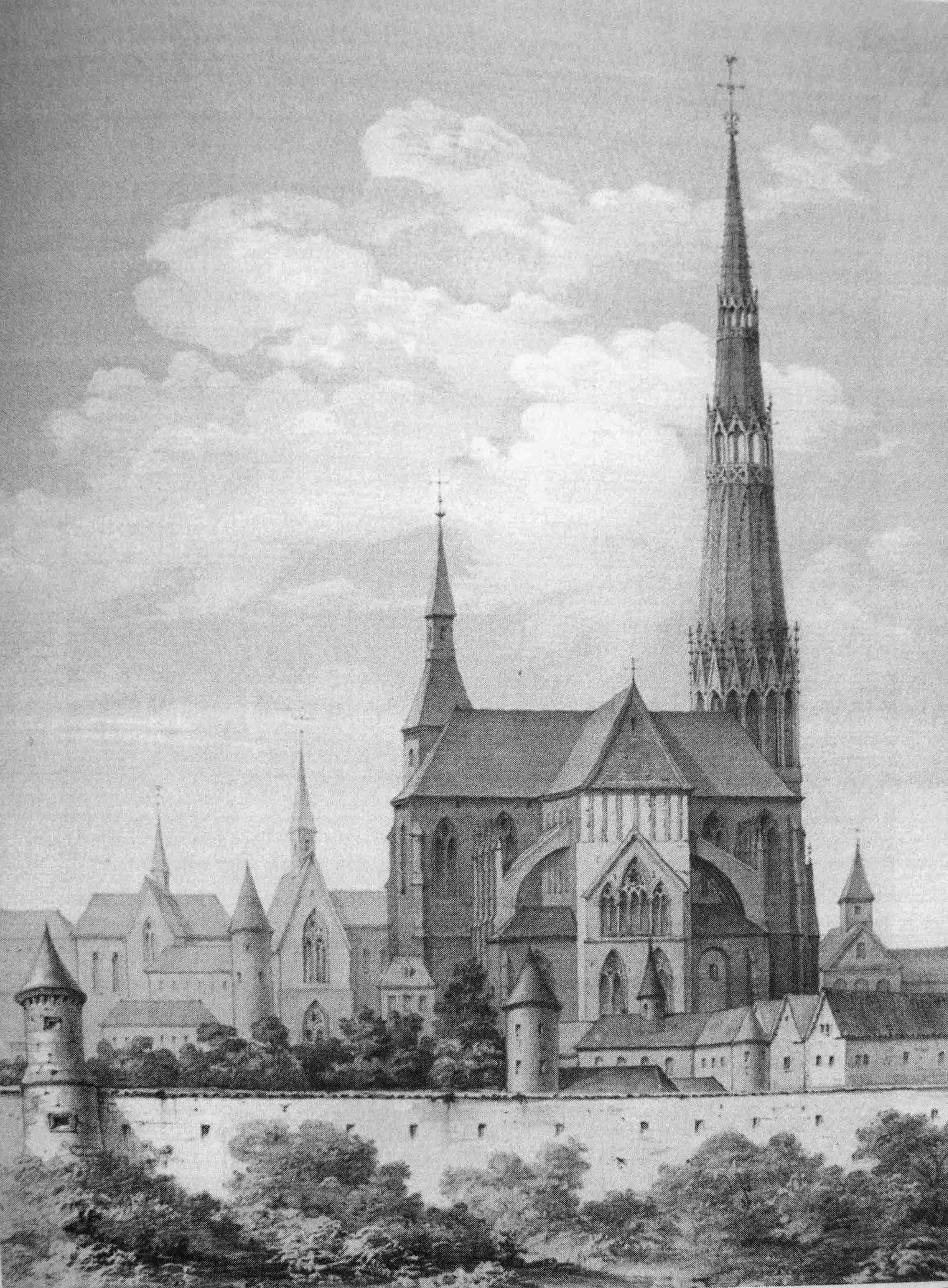
Cathedral before the 1668 fire

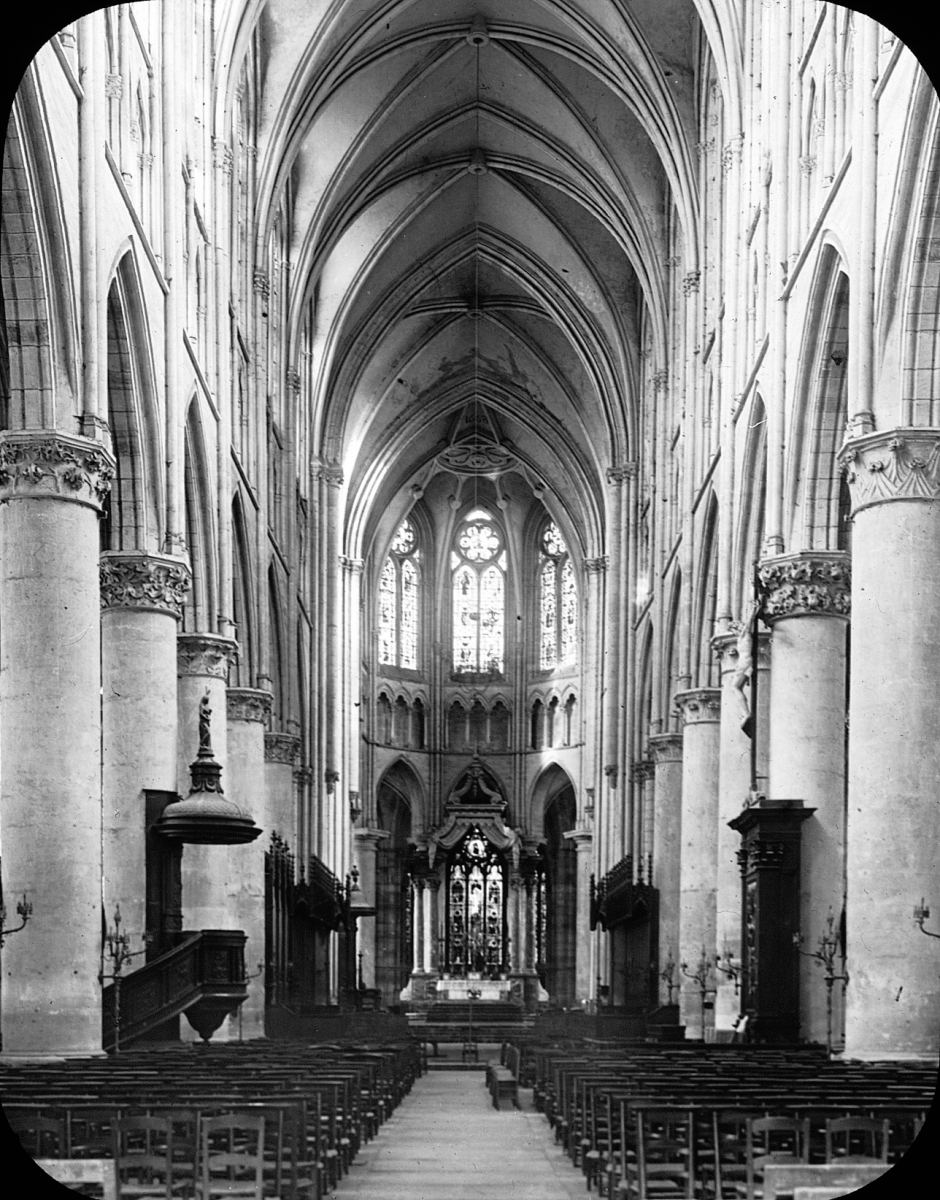
Nave

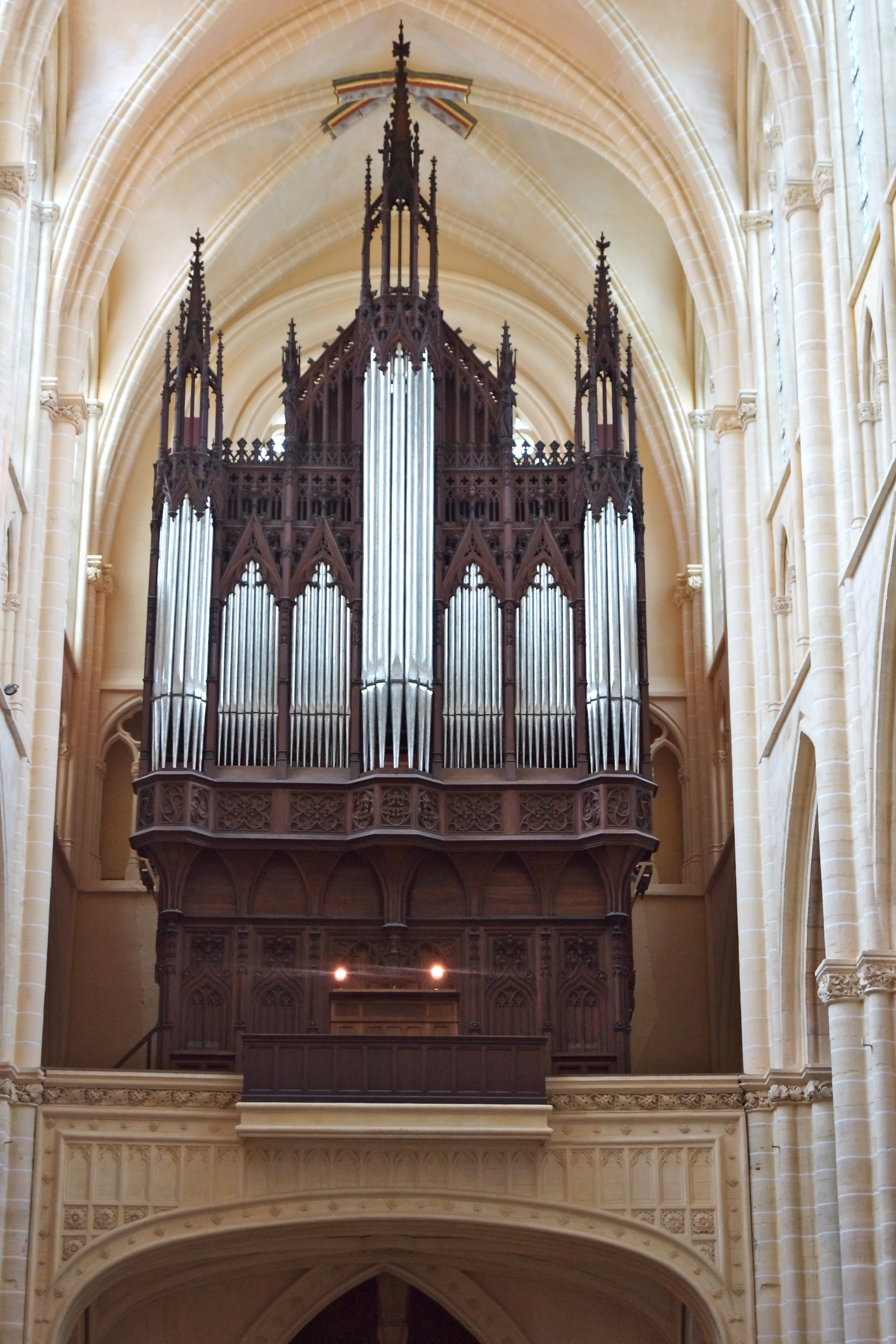
Organ

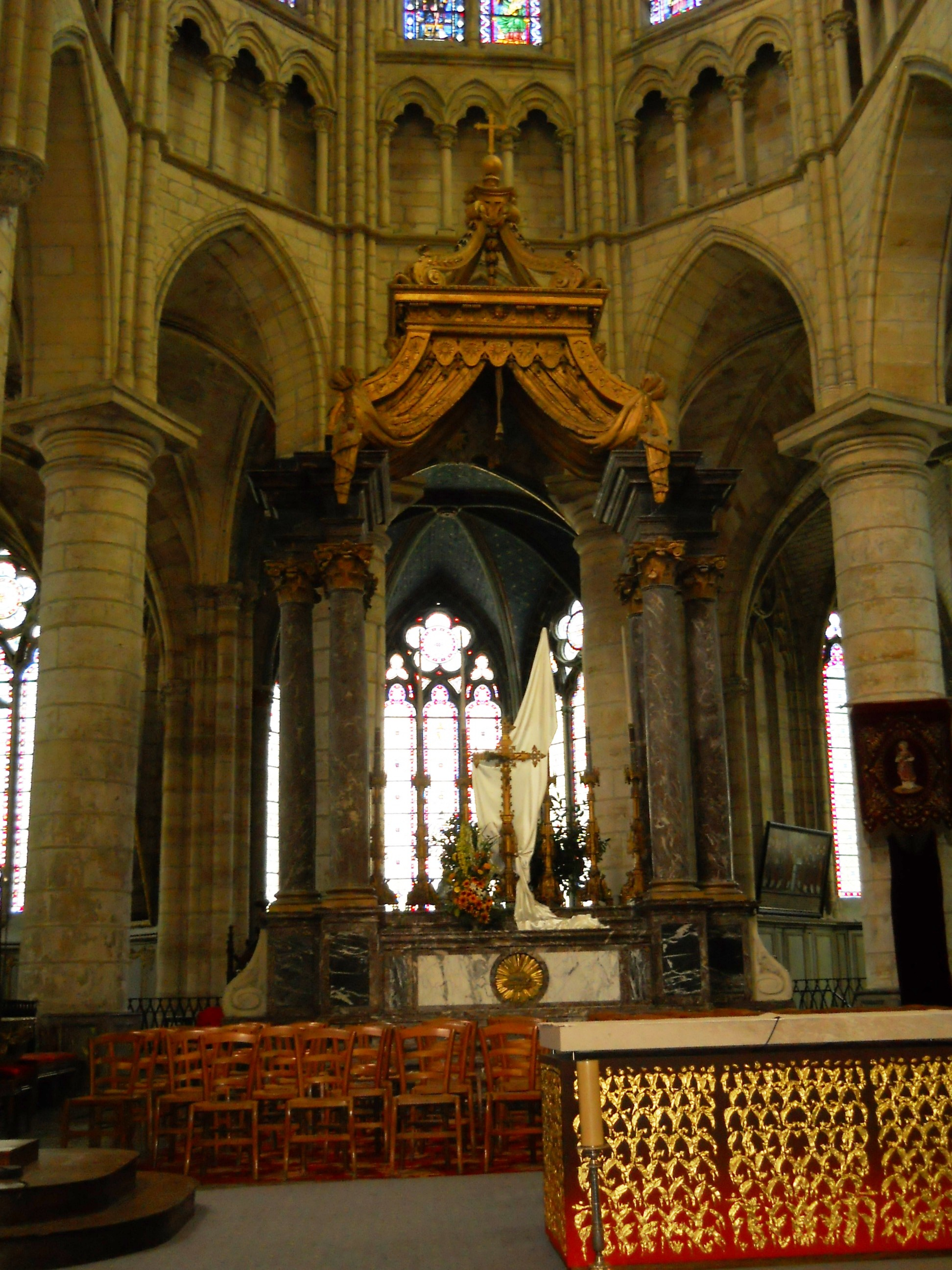
Choir and high altar

== See also ==
- List of Gothic Cathedrals in Europe

== Books ==
- Estrayez-Cabassolle, Abbé (1842). Notice historique et descriptive sur la cathédrale de Châlons-sur-Marne (in French). Châlons-sur-Marne: T.-J. Martin.
- Longnon, Auguste (1897). Cartulaire du chapitre de l'église cathédrale de Châlons-sur-Marne (in French). Paris: A.Picard et Fils.
- Lucot, Paul (1884). Les verrières de la cathédrale de Chalons: en général et plus particulièrement les verrières des collatéraux (in French). Chalons-sur-Marne: F. Thouille. [stained glass]
- Villes, Alain (2007). La Cathédrale Saint-Etienne de Châlons-en-Champagne et sa place dans l'architecture médiévale (in French). Langres: D. Guéniot. ISBN 978-2-87825-226-2.

== Sources ==
- Catholic Hierarchy: Diocese of Châlons
- Catholic Encyclopedia: Châlons-sur-Marne
- Unofficial Cathedral website
