= Saint Poma =

Sister of the first bishop of Chalons-sur-Marme, France

Bishop
- Venerated in: Roman Catholic Church
- Feast: June 27

Saint Poma was the sister of Saint Memmius (in French "Memmie de Châlons") who is venerated as the first bishop of Châlons-sur-Marne (present-day Châlons-en-Champagne) in France. She lived in the late third century.

Saint Poma's feast day is 27 June.

Her remains are interred in the Basilica of Saint Memmius in Saint-Memmie, France, near those of her brother and four other men who succeeded him as bishop in Châlons.
