= Côme Clausse =

Côme (or Cosmo) Clausse lord Marchaumont (1530? – 1558) was a notary and secretary of the king, and was Secretary of State for King Henry II of France, from 1547 until his death in 1558.

== Biography ==
He was the second son of John Clauss († 1504), correction to the Board of Auditors of Paris, lord of Marchaumont in Picardy, and Philip Bailey. Royal notary, secretary of the Dauphin Francis (1540) and then Henry, son of Francis I, he is chairman of the Board of Auditors of Nantes and steward of the business area of Britainny, traditionally vested in Dauphin France.

Upon his accession in April 1547, King Henry II named him one of the four secretaries of state responsible for its commandments and he performed that function until his death in 1558. In 1549, he is provided alongside the Office of Comptroller of ordinary wars. He followed the King to Damvillers (1552) and was knighted after the capture of that city.

He bought in 1550 the land of Fleury-en-Biere, and built the castle (today the department of Seine-et-Marne) which is given to his eldest son Henry. He bought for 15,000 pounds, on 20 February 1552, the land Courances (current department of Essonne), which is given after his death to his youngest son Peter. He also acquired a town hotel at Fontainebleau.

He married Marie Bourgeois, daughter of Francis Bourgeois (Burgensis), first physician to Francis I; they had thirteen children, including:

- Henry, lord of Fleury-en-Biere, godson of Henry II, Grand Master of Waters and Forests of France (elder);
- Peter, lord of Marchemont (second son);
- Nicolas (1545–1573), bishop of Chalons in 1572 (third son);
- Como (1548–1624), bishop of Chalons in 1575.

== Sources ==
- Olivier Poncet, « Posséder Courances (XVe-XIXe siècle) », in : Valentine de Ganay et Laurent Le Bon (dir.), Courances, Paris, Flammarion, 2003, p. 77
- La Chesnaye des Bois, Dictionnaire de la Noblesse, 2e édition, Paris Veuve Duchesne, 1772, tome IV, p. 555

Political offices
| Preceded by unknown | Minister of Foreign Affairs; 1547–1559 | Succeeded by Florimond II Robertet, seigneur de Fresnes |
