= Notre-Dame de l'Épine =

Basilique Notre-Dame de l'Épine
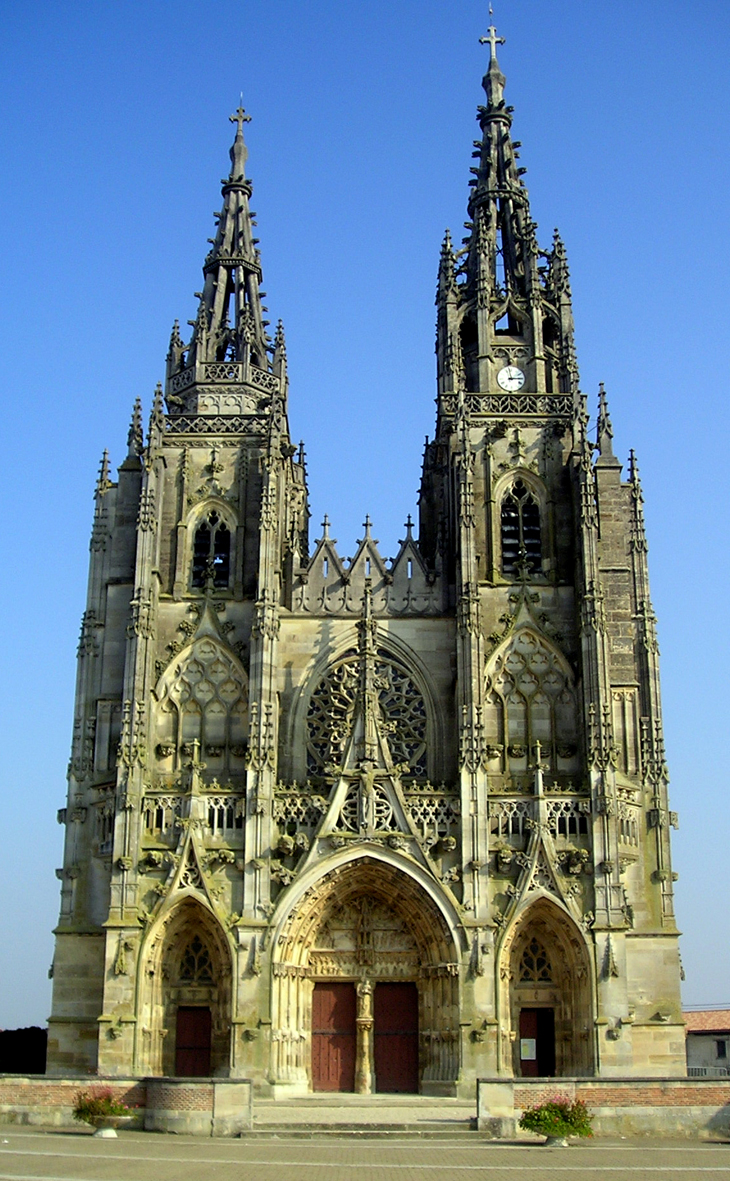
- Façade of the Basilica

- Location within France
- 48.97709°N 4.470408°E
- Location: L'Épine
- Country: France
- Denomination: Roman Catholic

History
- Founded: 1405

Architecture
- Heritage designation: Part of the Routes of Santiago de Compostela in France UNESCO WHS
- Architectural type: church
- Style: Gothic Flamboyant

Administration
- Diocese: Châlons

UNESCO World Heritage Site
- Official name: Basilique Notre-Dame de l'Epine
- Criteria: Cultural: ii, iv, vi
- Reference: 868-029
- Inscription: 1998 (22nd Session)

The Basilica of Our Lady of l'Épine (French: Basilique Notre-Dame de l'Épine), also known as Notre-Dame de l'Épine, is a Roman Catholic basilica in the small village of L'Épine, Marne, near Châlons-en-Champagne and Verdun. It is one of the last major French Gothic cathedrals constructed, a major masterpiece in the Flamboyant Gothic style, and has been classified as a UNESCO World Heritage Site since 1998 for its significance as a pilgrimage site on the Camino de Santiago.

== History ==
The origins of the cathedral date to the late 13th century, when a small shrine was erected and dedicated to the Virgin Mary on the site of the existing church. To accommodate the growing religious presence and the importance of the town as a pilgrimage site on the route to Santiago de Compostela, construction of a larger cathedral was initiated by Charles VI. The cathedral was constructed in a Rayonnant Gothic style, likely inspired by Toul Cathedral around 1405 and continued until 1527. Notre-Dame-de-l'Épine takes its name from the devotion given to a statue of the Virgin holding the Child Jesus. According to a legend from the 17th century that has since evolved, the statue was found by shepherds in the Middle Ages in a burning thorn bush. The basilica has the dimensions of a cathedral and is in the Gothic architectural tradition. The pilgrimage remained significant throughout the 16th century, but declined noticeably in the early 17th century. In 1624, the Franciscans took over the church attempting to continue the popularity of the pilgrimage, but this order of preachers failed to transform the pilgrimage of those seeking help into a missionary pilgrimage.

During the French Revolution, the cathedral was closed and turned into a Temple of Reason. The large statues in the portals were also removed, and the spire of the north church tower was demolished in 1789 to make way for an optical telegraph between Strasbourg and Paris. The tower was not rebuilt until 1868. The basilica was classified a historic monument in 1840 and elevated to a basilica from 1914. In 1998 it was registered on the World Heritage List by UNESCO under the title of "roads to St Jacques de Compostela in France". Notre-Dame de l'Épine has always struck travelers and inspired writers, especially Victor Hugo, Alexandre Dumas, Joris-Karl Huysmans, Paul Claudel and Paul Fort.

== Furnishings ==
The basilica has remarkable gargoyles. Inside is a rood screen of the late 15th century, whose right arcade houses the statue of the Virgin for which this basilica is famous.

Statues include the Venerated Virgin (about 1300), seated virgin (15th century) and St. Jacques in wood (17th century). The altars date from 1542, and the triumph crucifix from the 16th century. The tribune and organ case are 16th century. The tribune is decorated with eight apostles and seven pagan gods (inscriptions added in 1825 by Father Brisson). The choir organ is from Merklin. Stained glass is from the 19th and 20th centuries, mainly manufactured by the Champigneulle house.

== Gallery ==
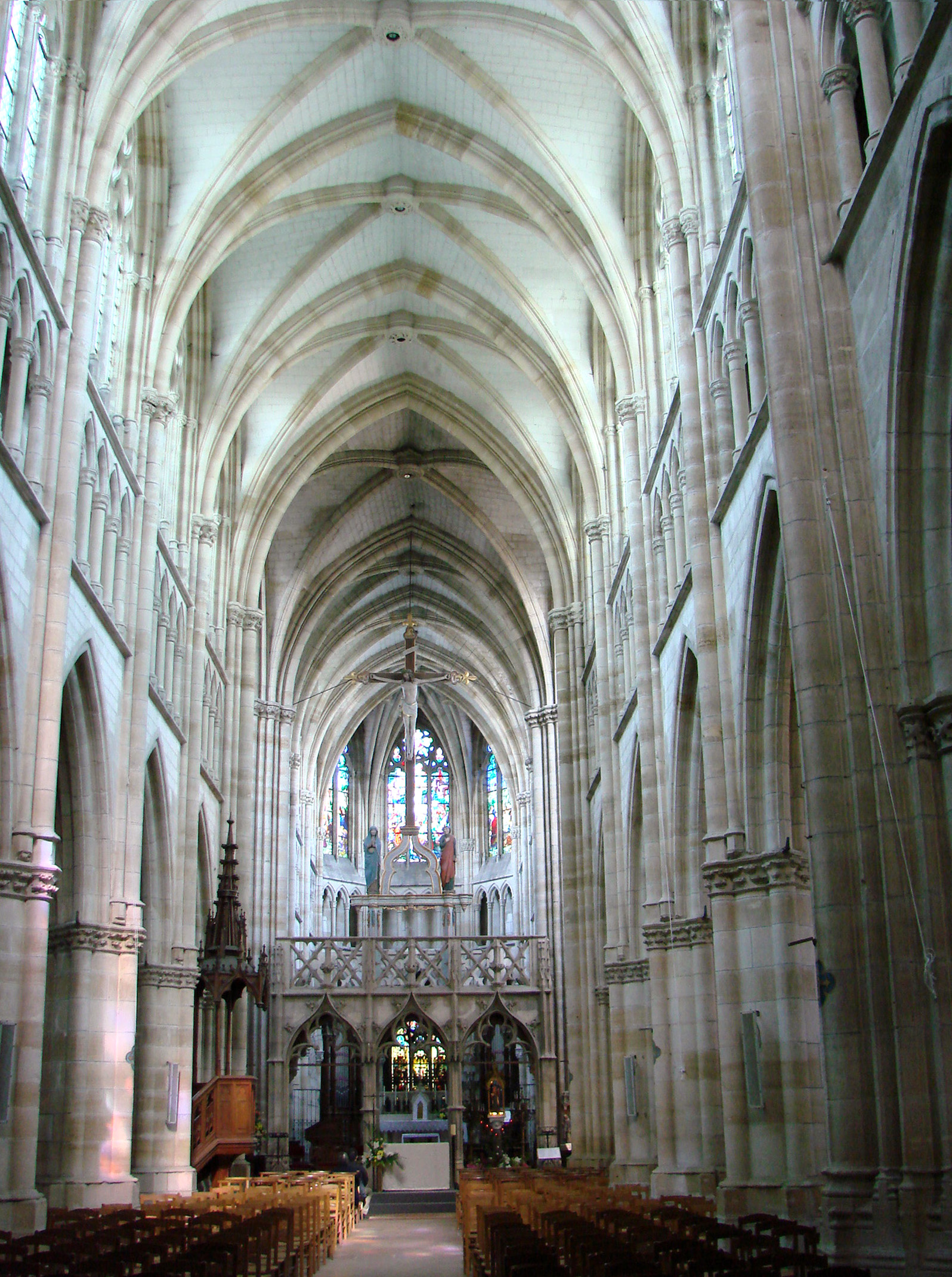
Nave

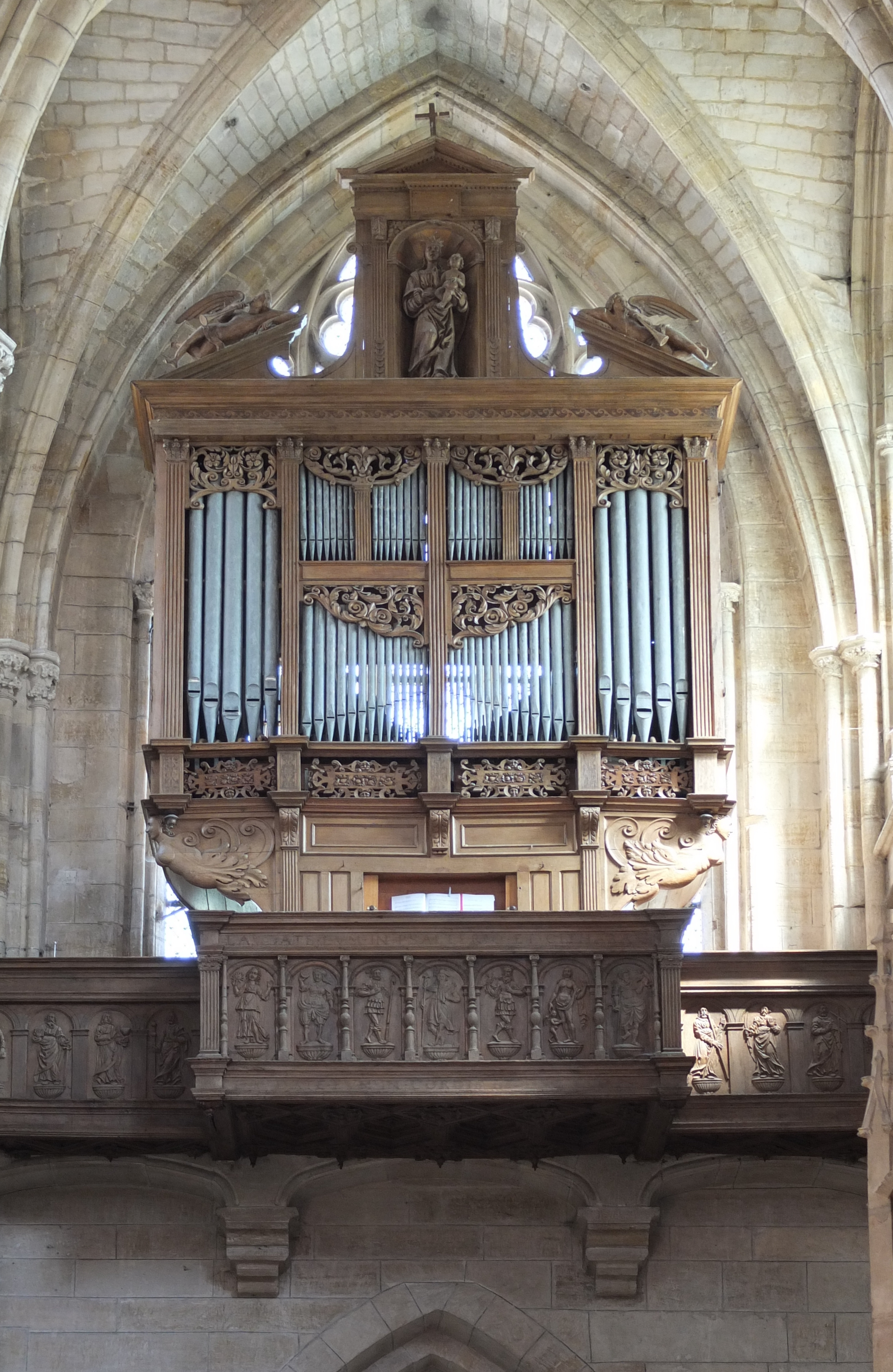
Pipe organ

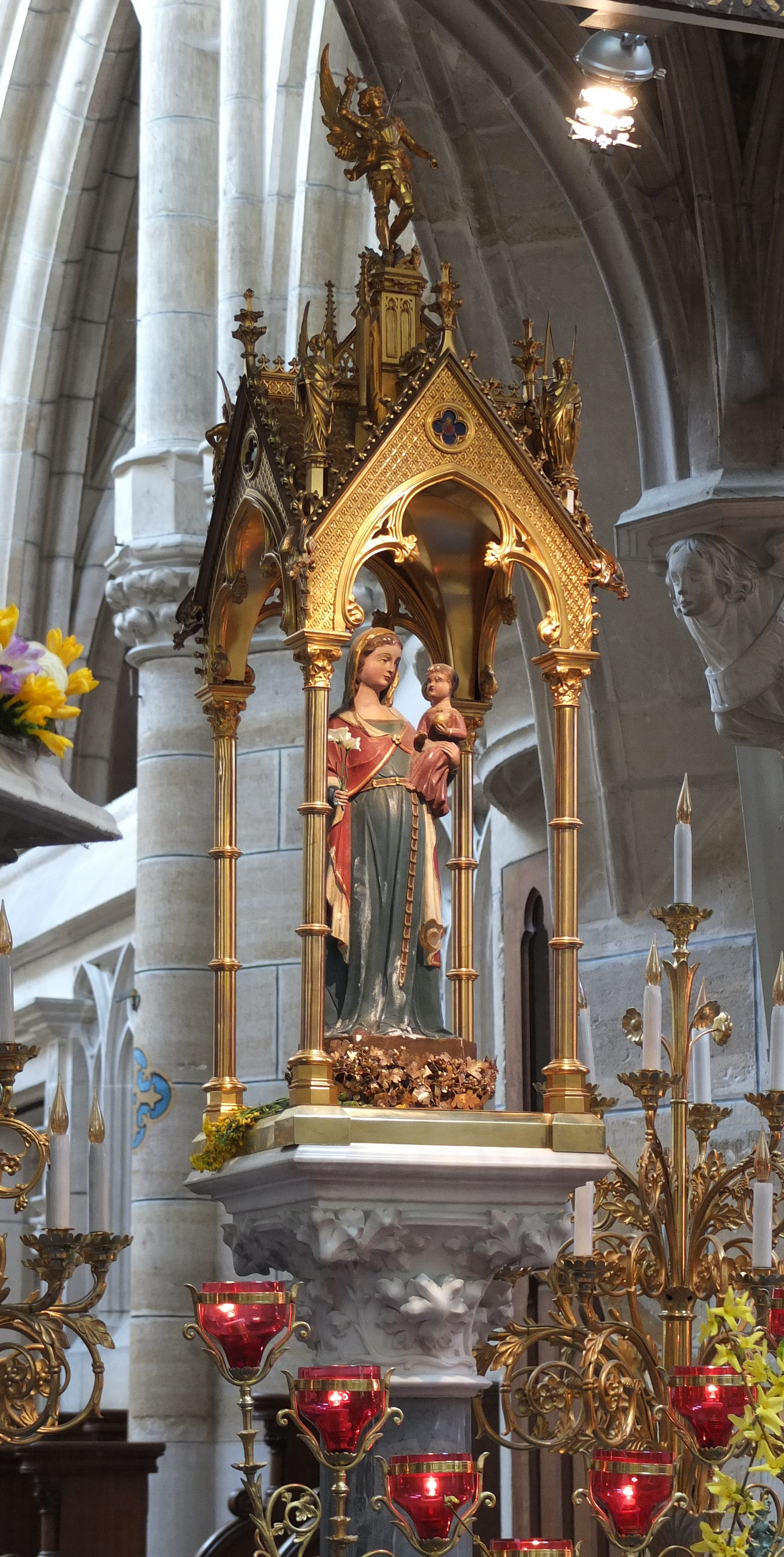
Venerated Virgin (about 1300)
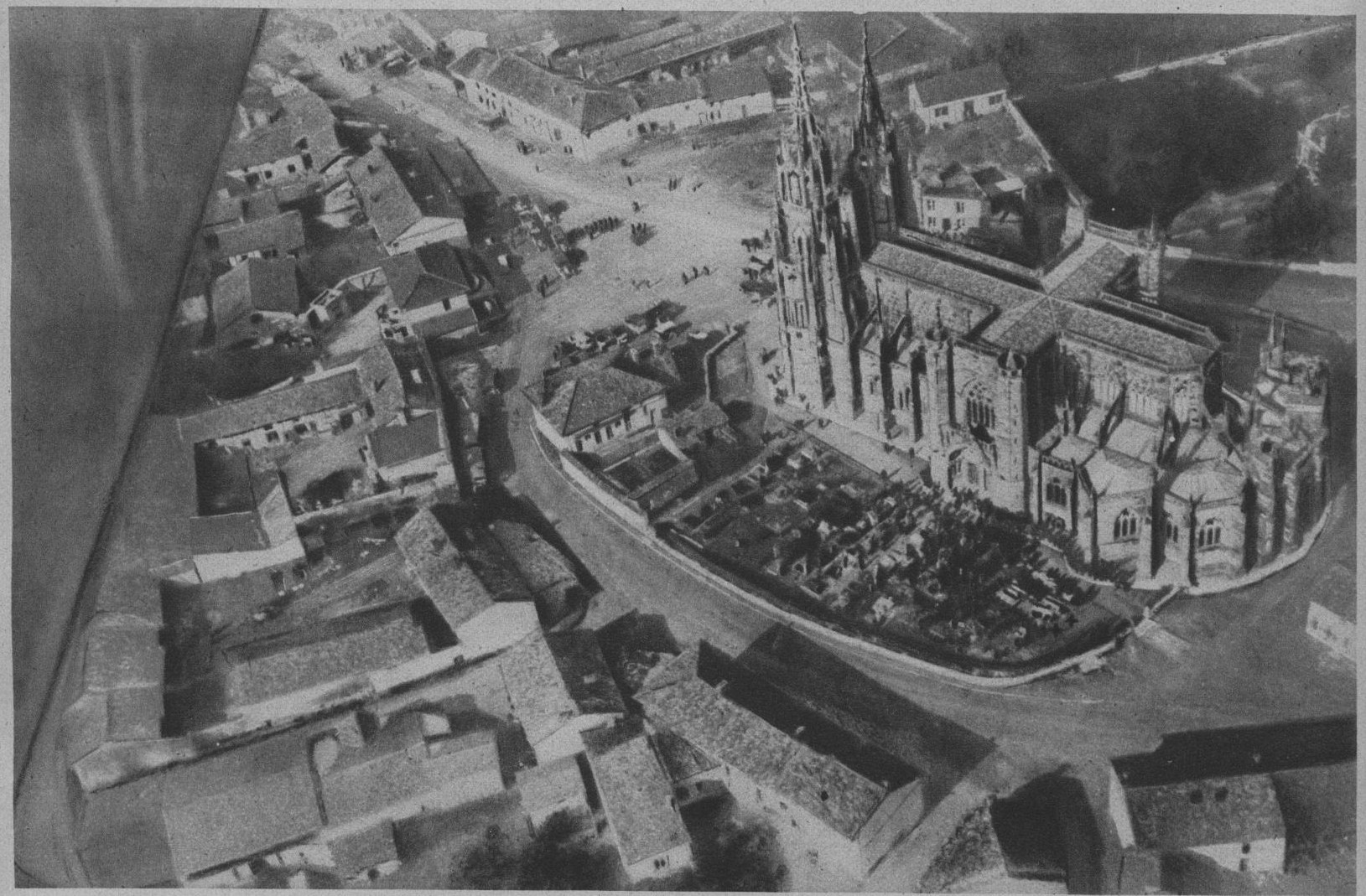
Aerial view (1914).

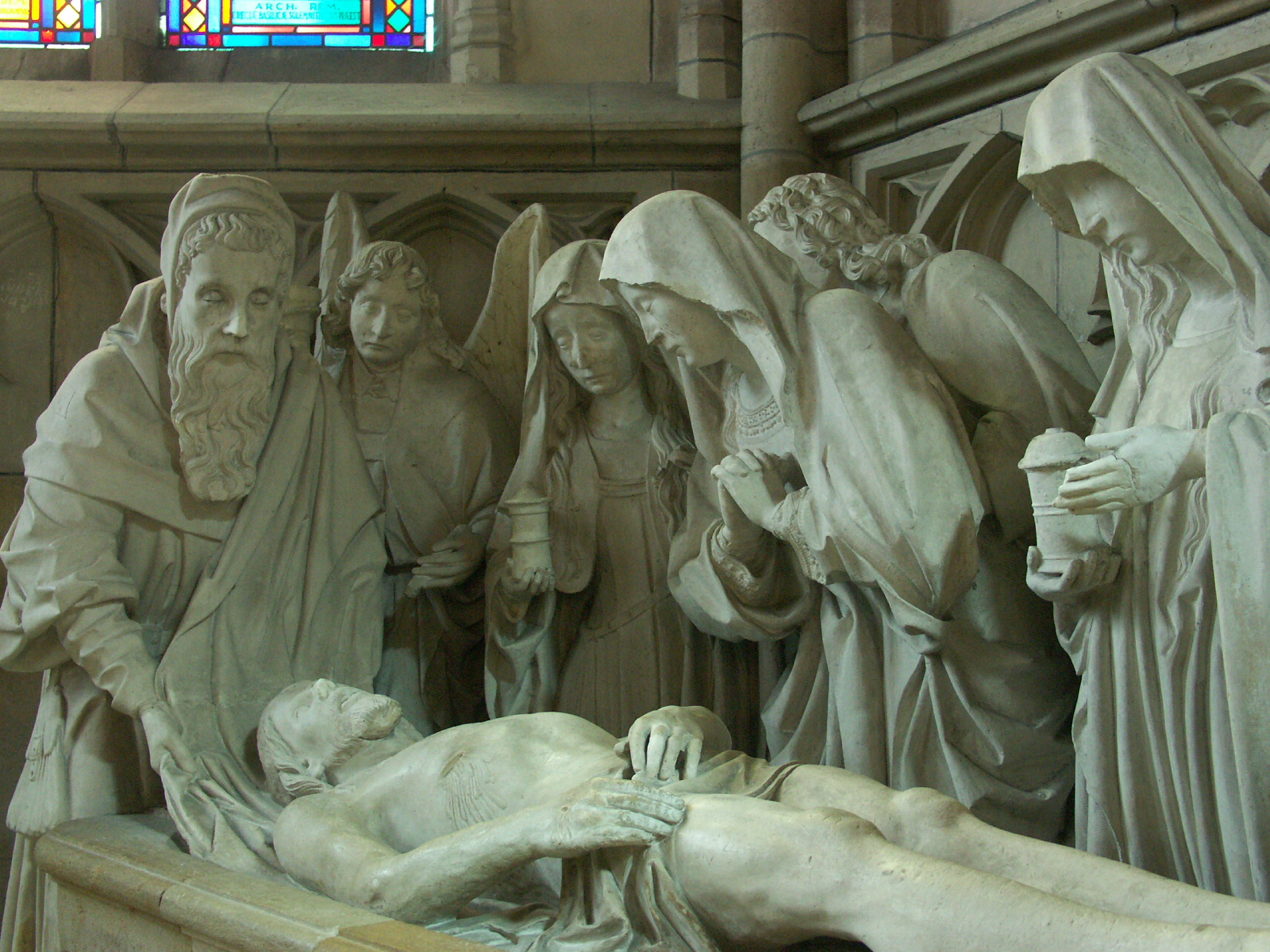
Lamentation of Christ

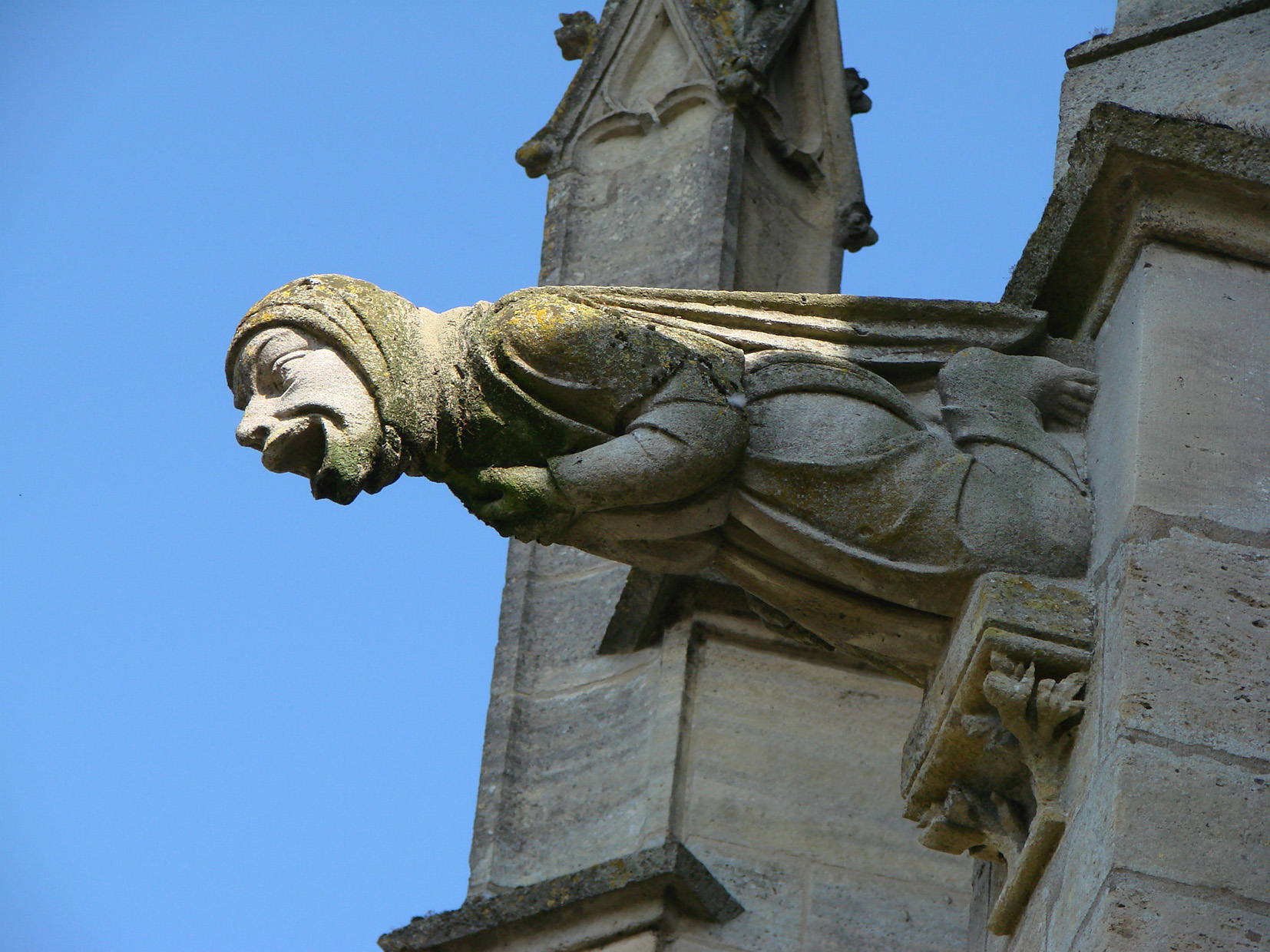
Gargoyle

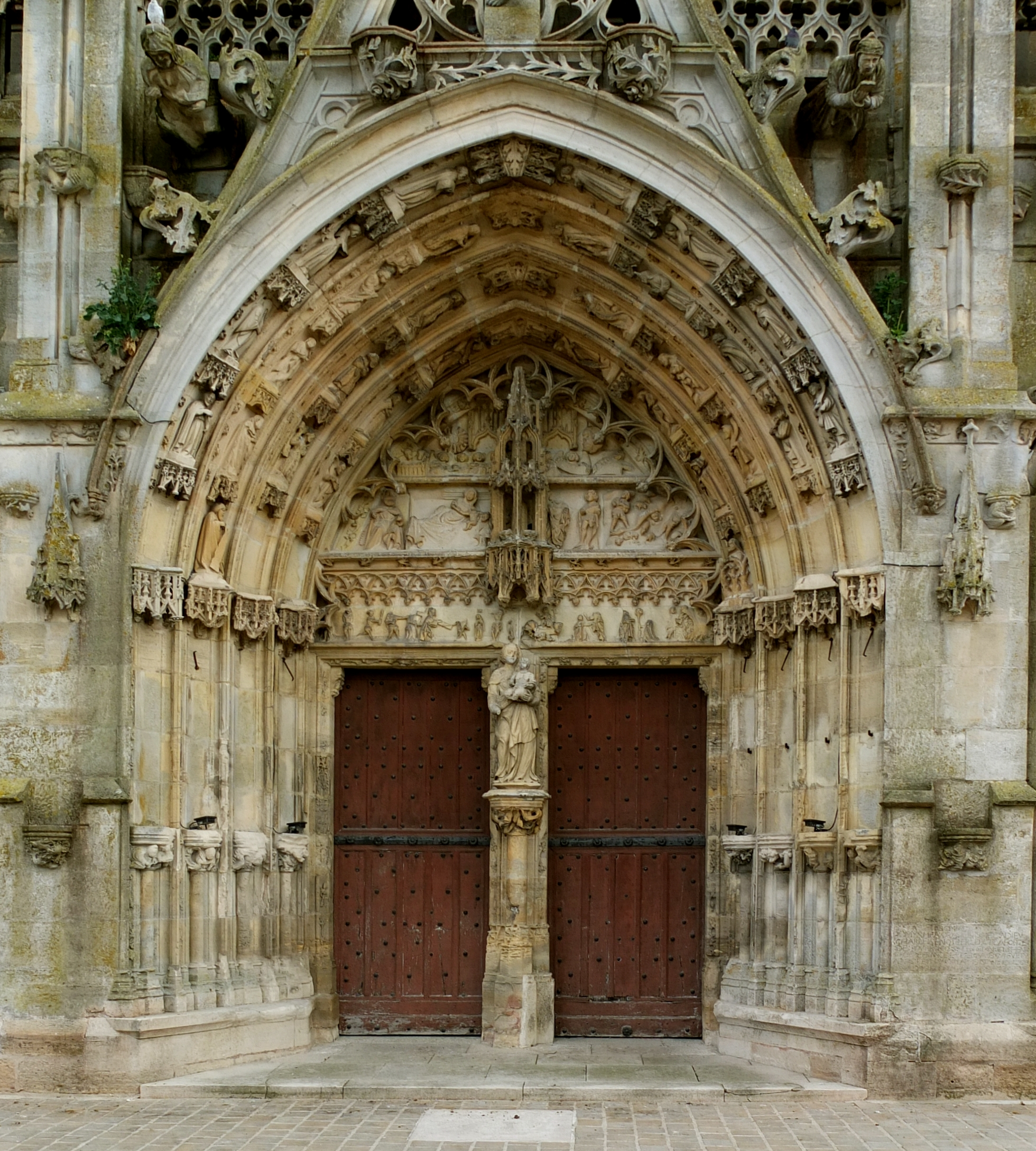
Main portal

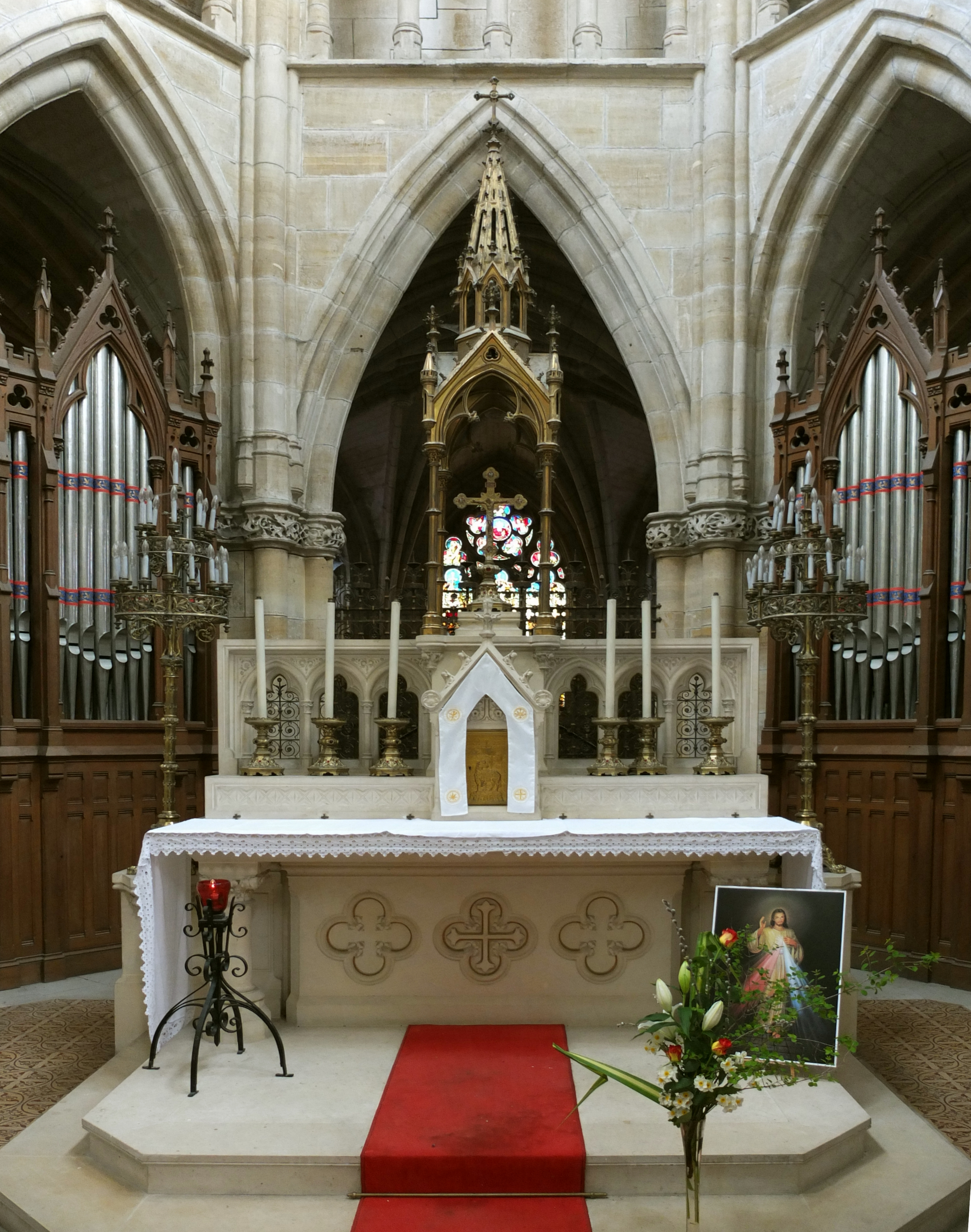
Main altar

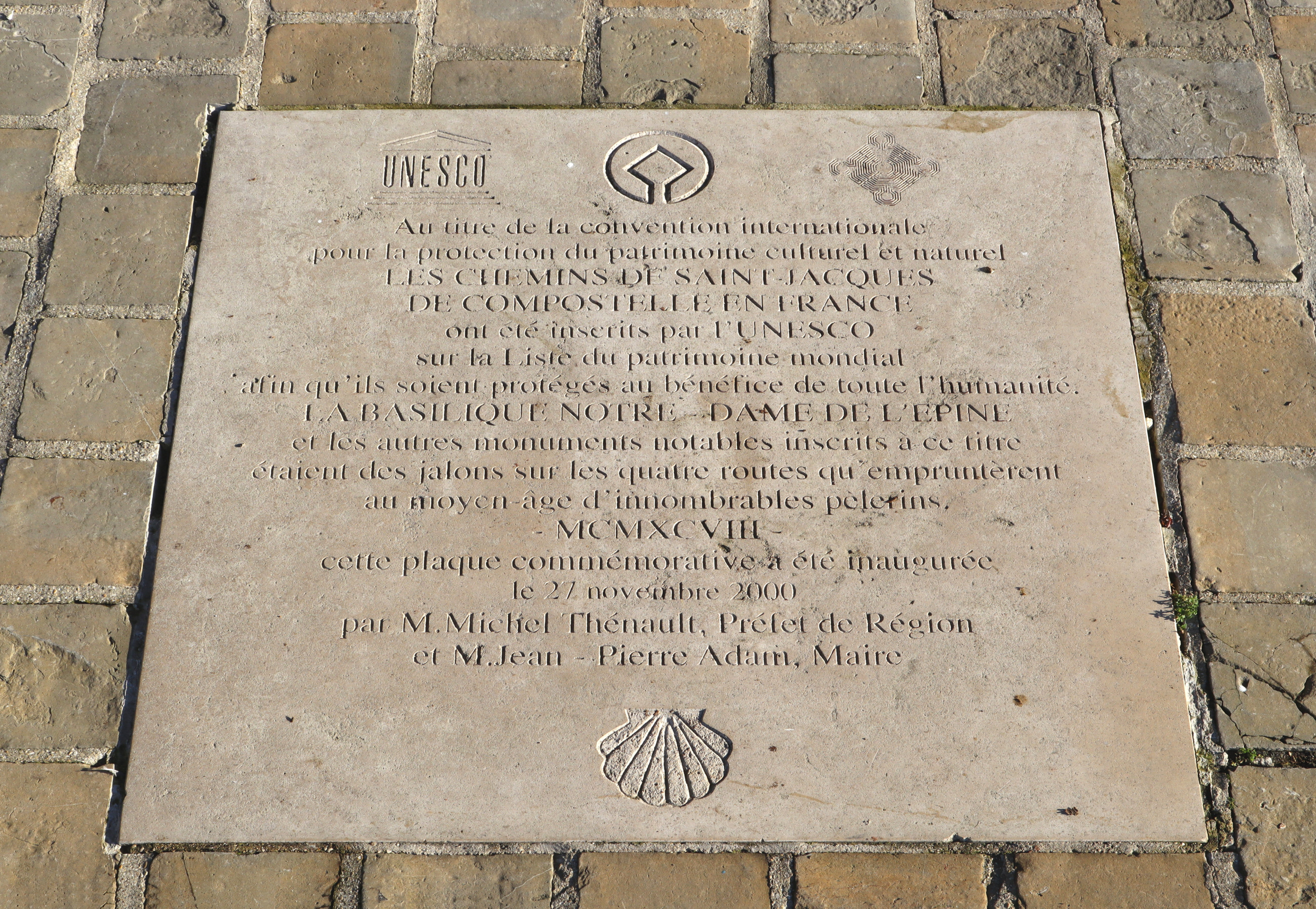
Appointment to UNESCO World Heritage Site
