= 7th Infantry Division (France) =

Former French Army formation

- 7^{e} Division d'Infanterie
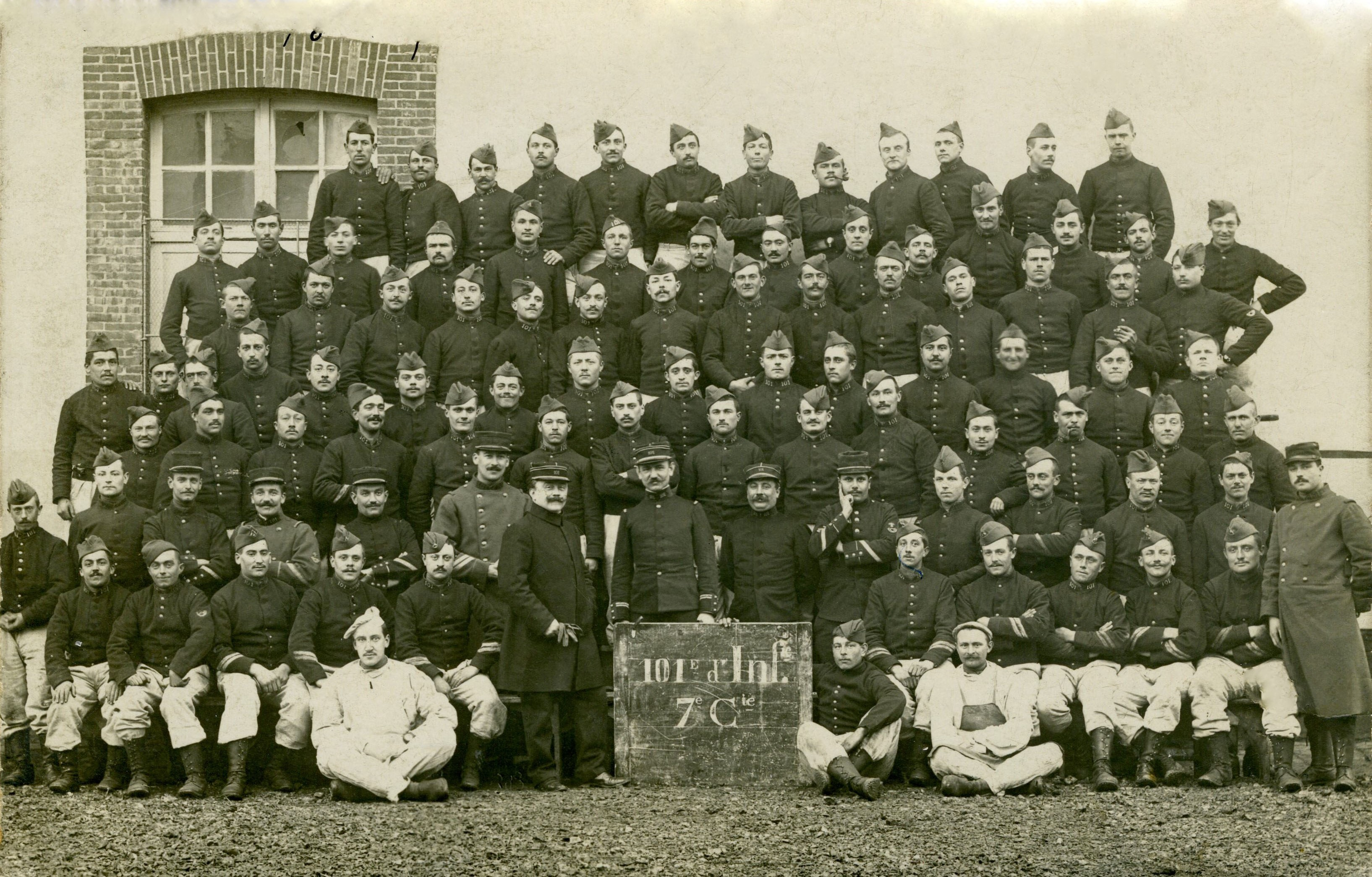
- A compagny of the 101st regiment of the 7th Infantry Division in the 1900s.
- Active: 1873 – 1940
- Country: France
- Branch: Army
- Type: Infantry division
- Role: Infantry
- Engagements: 1914 - Ardennes; 1914 - 1st Marne; 1914 - Albert; 1915 - Champagne; 1916 - Verdun; 1917 - 2nd Verdun; 1918 - Lys; 1918 - 4th Champagne

The 7th Infantry Division (French: 7^{e} Division d'Infanterie) was a French military formation from 1873 to 1940 that fought in World War I and World War II.

== Commanders ==
- Louis Duplessis 18 October 1873 – 25 February 1878
- Alphonse Lefebvre 16 March 1878 – 11 February 1879
- Charles Rolland 10 June 1879 – 24 September 1885
- Félix Coiffé 28 October 1885 – 5 January 1889
- Baptiste Tramond 9 January 1889 – 1 July 1889
- Léon de Saint-Mars 19 July 1889 – ?
- Édouard de Verdière 20 September 1890 – ?
- Léon de Saint-Mars 28 May 1892 – ?
- Jean Saint-Marc 6 June 1893 – 3 November 1894
- Jules Jollivet 12 November 1894 – ?
- Gustave Niox 28 October 1899 – 19 November 1901
- Henri Fabre 30 December 1901 – 10 November 1903
- Alexandre Percin 18 March 1904 – ?
- Marie Silvestre 12 March 1907 – ?
- Tell Chapel 22 January 1909 – ?
- Pierre Roques 9 April 1912 – 18 August 1913
- Louis de Trentinian 9 September 1913 – 25 September 1914
- Desvaux 26 September 1914 – 3 October 1914
- Colas 3 October 1914 – ?
- Charles Weywada 15 May 1915 – ?
- Joseph Bulot 22 October 1917 – ?
- Henri Lebocq 22 March 1919 – 29 December 1923
- François Hupel 1939 - 1940
- Louis de Saint-Vincent 1940

== Before 1914 ==
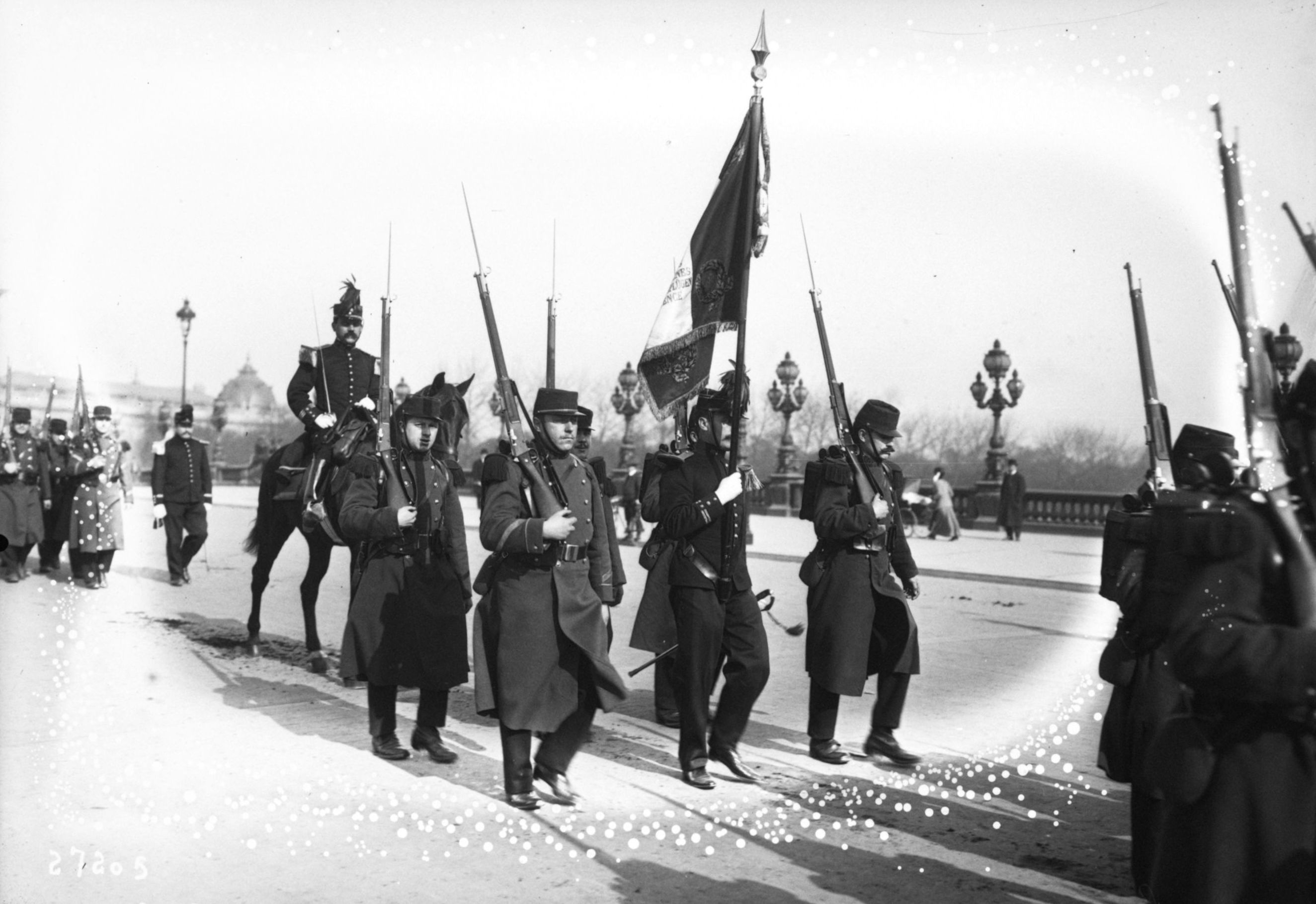
The 104th regiment (14th brigade) parading in Paris (25 February 1913).

The division is formed by the reorganization of the French infantry corps decree (28 September 1873). It is part of the 4th Army Corps (Le Mans), it is formed of two brigades of two regiments each:

- 13th brigade :
  - 101st Infantry Regiment
  - 102nd Infantry Regiment
- 14th brigade :
  - 103rd Infantry Regiment
  - 104th Infantry Regiment

In 1914, the division kept the same composition the brigades are stationed Paris while their where located in Dreux, Chartres, Alençon and Argentan.

== World War I ==
=== Composition ===
- Infantry
  - 13th brigade
    - 101st Infantry Regiment August 1914 – June 1915
    - 315th Infantry Regiment June 1915 – armistice
    - 102nd Infantry Regiment August 1914 – armistice
  - 14th brigade
    - 103rd Infantry Regiment August 1914 – armistice
    - 104th Infantry Regiment August 1914 – armistice
  - 1st pioneer battalion of the 34th Territorial Infantry Regiment August 1918 – armistice
- Cavalry
  - 1 Squadron of the 14th Hussards Regiment August 1914 – January 1915
  - 1 Squadron of the 13th Hussards Regiment January 1915 – January 1917
  - 2 Squadrons of the 14th Hussards Regiment January 1917 – armistice
- Artillery
  - 3 groups of 75 mm guns from the 26th Artillery Regiment August 1914 – armistice
  - the 123rd battery of 58 mm mortars from the 44th Artillery Regiment July 1916 – July 1917
  - the 101st battery of 58 mm mortars from the 26th Artillery Regiment (former 123rd battery of the 44th Regiment) July 1917 – armistice
  - the 5th group of 155 mm guns from the 104th Artillery Regiment (former 4th group of the 101st Artillery Regiment) July 1918 – armistice
- Engineering
  - Company 4/1 from the 1st Engineer Regiment August 1914 – armistice
  - Company 4/51 (ex-4/1 bis) 1st Engineer Regiment 1915 – armistice
  - Company 4/21 from the 1st Engineer Regiment 1916 – armistice
  - pioneer sappers from the 1st Engineer Regiment 1916 – 1917
  - a detachment from the 8th Signal Regiment 1916 – armistice

=== History ===
==== 1914 ====
- 5 – 10 August: rail transport to the Verdun area.
- 10 – 21 August: cover on the Othain river around Mangiennes.
- 21 – 24 August: offensive toward the North, in the direction of Latour. Engaged on August 22 in the Battle of the Ardennes.
- 24 August – 3 September: retreat to the Meuse, around Brieulles-sur-Meuse.
  - 25 August: fights in Marville.
  - 26 August: stop behind the Meuse around Romagne-sous-Montfaucon, then Beauclair.
  - 30–31 August: fights around Beauclair and Tailly.
  - 1 September: retreat toward Sainte-Menehould, passing by Saint-Juvin and Vienne-le-Château.
- 3 – 7 September: rail transport from Sainte-Menehould to Villemomble.
- 7 – 13 September: taxi and rail transport to Nanteuil-le-Haudouin. From September 8 Engaged in the Battle of the Marne.
  - 8–10 September: Battle of the Ourcq: fighting around Bouillancy and Silly-le-Long. from the 10, pursuit through Retheuil and Attichy, until the Tracy-le-Val, Carlepont region.
- 13 – 19 September: Engaged in the Battle of the Aisne: violent fightings around Puisaleine and bois Saint-Mard.
- 19 September – 27 December: Removed from the frontline ; moved through Compiègne and Moyenneville, toward Lassigny. Engaged in the Battle of Albert around Lassigny and Champien from September 21. settling of the frontline and defense of the Tilloloy, l'Échelle-Saint-Aurin area.
  - 4 November: offensive on Andechy.
- 27 December 1914 – 14 January 1915: Removed from the frontline and rail transport to the regions of Montdidier and Courtisols; resting time.

==== 1915 ====
- 14 January – 5 February: railway transport to the Bazoches area; resting time. (from January 27 to February 6, elements in the Paissy area).
- 5 – 18 February: rail transport from Fismes to Châlons-sur-Marne, waiting around Courtisols.
- 18 February – 21 March: moving toward the North. Engaged in the First Battle of Champagne in Perthes-lès-Hurlus from February 23, under orders from the 33rd Infantry Division. Then, elements placed in the North of Perthes-lès-Hurlus.
- 21 March – 30 October: removed from the frontline, and from March 23 occupation of a sector around Wacques farm and Auberive-sur-Suippe (mine fighting). From August 29 : occupation of a new sector around Auberive-sur-Suippe and to its West.
  - 25 September: engaged in the Second Battle of Champagne French offensive toward Auberive-sur-Suippe.
  - 28 September: the Weywada provisional Infantry Division is formed by regrouping the command of the 7th, the 14th brigade and the 248th brigade of the 124th Infantry Division while the 13th brigade is transferred to the 42nd Infantry Division.
  - 30 September - 4 October: in 2nd line.
  - 12 October: enlargement of the font to the ferme de Moscou. The 7th Division is reformed with its normal composition (13th and 14th brigades).
- 30 October – 7 November: removed from the frontline and resting time around Possesse.
- 7 November 1915 – 10 April 1916: truck transport to the frontline, occupation of a sector in the Ville-sur-Tourbe, Aisne river area.

==== 1916 ====
- 10 – 26 April: removed from the front; resting time in the East of Sainte-Menehould.
- 26 April – 19 August: moving to the North and occupation of a sector in the region of Main de Massiges.
  - 28 June: movement and occupation of a new sector near la Main de Massiges and Maisons de Champagne.
- 19 – 29 August: removed from the frontline; resting time around Dommartin-sur-Yèvre.
- 29 August – 25 September: truck and railway transport par camions et par voie ferrée to the Verdun area. Some elements of the Division are engaged in the Battle of Verdun from September August 29 the whole division join on September 2, they fight in the woods of Haudiomont and the Thiaumont fortification.
  - 3 September: French attack on Thiaumont.
  - 4 September: German attack.
  - 6 September: French attack on Thiaumont.
  - 20 September: French attack.
- 25 September – 22 October: removed from the front, transported by truck to the region of Laheycourt; resting time.
- 22 October – 14 décembre: moving back to the 2nd line in Verdun.
  - 28 October: occupation of a sector near the woods of Haudromont and the village of Douaumont (excluded).
- 14 – 28 December: removed from the front and transport by rail to the region of Saint-Dizier; resting time.
  - 22 December: transport by train to Baccarat; resting time.

==== 1917 ====
- 28 December 1916 – 28 May 1917: occupation of a sector in the region of la Chapelotte, the Vezouze river.
- 28 May – 23 June: removed from the front; resting time near Rosières-aux-Salines and Saffais.
- 23 – 29 June: rail transport to the Bayon region, then to the Ligny-en-Barrois region.
  - 27 June: railway transport to Verdun.
- 29 June – 8 August: occupation of a sector near Louvemont, Vacherauville and Marre, reduced on the right on July 14, until the côte du Poivre.
- 8 – 27 August: Removed from the frontline; resting time near Dieue-sur-Meuse.
  - 20 August: elements of the division engaged in the 2nd Battle of Verdun capture of the côte de Talou.
- 27 August – 5 November: occupation of a sector near Haudiomont and Damloup (detached elements to the Éparges until September 17).
- 5 – 26 November: removed from the frontline

truck transport to Tours-sur-Marne; resting and training.

- 26 November 1917 – 1 May 1918: movement to the frontline, occupation of a sector near mont Cornillet and the ferme des Marquises.

==== 1918 ====
- 1 May 1918 – 6 May: removed from the frontline and resting near Vadenay and Bouy.
- 6 – 21 May: transported by train to the region of Saint-Omer; resting time.
  - 11 May: rail transport to the Cassel region; resting near l'Abeel.
- 21 May – 2 July: occupation of a sector in Scherpenberg and La Clytte
  - 27 May: German attack (Battle of the Lys).
  - 2 June: extension of the frontline to the left until the mont Kemmel.
- 2–9 July: removed from the frontline (replaced by British men); regrouping in Esquelbecq. transport by railway to the Sézanne, Fère-Champenoise and Vertus region from July 4 Sézanne, Fère-Champenoise, Vertus; transported by truck to Tours-sur-Marne.
- 9 – 31 July: moving to la montagne de Reims; in 2nF line near Écueil. moving to Saint-Imoges from the 15th ; engaged in the Fourth Battle of Champagne near Leuvrigny and Festigny-les-Hameaux (fighting near Venteuil and Tincourt); Then in the Second Battle of the Marne (capture of Romigny on the 29th).
- 31 July – 18 August: removed from the frontline; resting near Orbais-l'Abbaye, Mareuil-le-Port and Troissy.
- 18 August – 26 September: transported by truck in the Vadenay, Cuperly region. From august August 23, occupation of a sector near Prunay and the south of mont Cornillet.
- 26 September – 20 October: engaged in the Meuse–Argonne offensive.
  - 5–7 October: resting in the region of the camp de Châlons then transported by truck to the butte de Souain.
  - 8 October: attack toward Saint-Clément-à-Arnes; On October 12, crossing of the Retourne river; on October 13, occupation of Givry and of the Givry front (Ambly-Fleury).
- 20 October – 6 November: removed from the frontline; resting near Bouy.
- 6 – 11 November: moving to the region of Suippes; engaged in third phase of the Meuse–Argonne offensive, pursuit toward the region of Sauville, Vendresse where the 7th Division was located during the Armistice of 11 November 1918.

=== Part of ===
The 7th division was part the 4th Army Corps during the entirety of the first World War. This corp was part of :

- 2nd Army
  - 21 September – 27 December 1914
  - 30 October 1915 – 4 January 1916
  - 29 August – 21 December 1916
  - 23 June – 5 November 1917
- 3rd Army
  - 2 – 27 August 1914
  - 29 August – 2 December 1914
- 4th Army
  - 28 August 1914
  - 28 December 1914 – 13 January 1915
  - 6 February – 29 October 1915
  - 5 January – 28 August 1916
  - 6 November 1917 – 5 May 1918
  - 18 August – 20 October 1918
  - 4 – 11 November 1918
- 5th Army
  - 14 January – 5 February 1915
  - 4 – 5 July 1918
  - 8 July – 17th août 1918
  - 21 October – 3 November 1918
- 7th Army
  - 7 – 20 September 1914
- 8th Army
  - 2 January – 22 June 1917
- 9th Army
  - 6 – 7 July 1918
- MP Group
  - 2 – 6 September 1914
- Lorraine Army Detachment (8th Army)
  - 22 December 1916 – 1 January 1917
- Nord Army Detachment (9th Army)
  - 6 May – 30 June 1918
- Supreme Headquarters Allied Forces
  - 2 – 3 July 1918

== Interwar ==
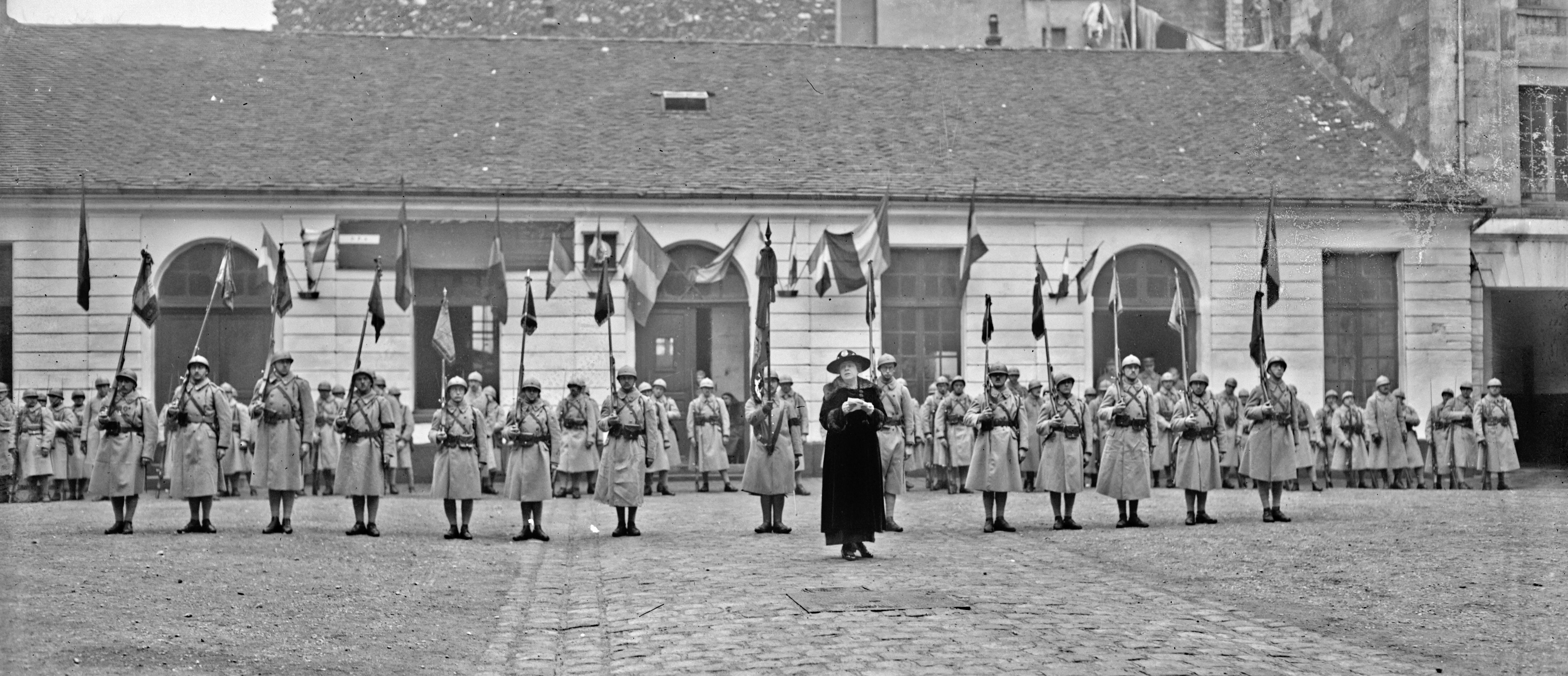
The flags of the 103rd et 104th Regiments of the 7th Division in Paris in November 1922.

The 7th division is dissolved in December 1923.

== World War II ==
=== Composition ===
On May 10, 1940, the 7th Division was composed of:

- 93rd Infantry Regiment
- 102nd Infantry Regiment
- 130th Infantry Regiment
- 31st Artillery Regiment
- 231st Artillery Regiment
- 40th Divisional Infantry Reconnaissance Group
- 1st and 2nd companies of the 6th Engineer Regiment
- 81st Telegraph Company
- 82nd Radio Company
- 4th Horse-drawn Train Company
- 4th Automobile Train Company
- 4th Divisional Exploitation Group
- 7th Divisional Sanitary Group sanitaire divisionnaire
- 7th Artillery Park.

=== History ===
During the Battle of France the 7th Division under the command of the general François Hupel is part of the 3rd Army.

== See also ==
- List of French divisions in World War I
- List of French divisions in World War II
