= Henri Lebocq =

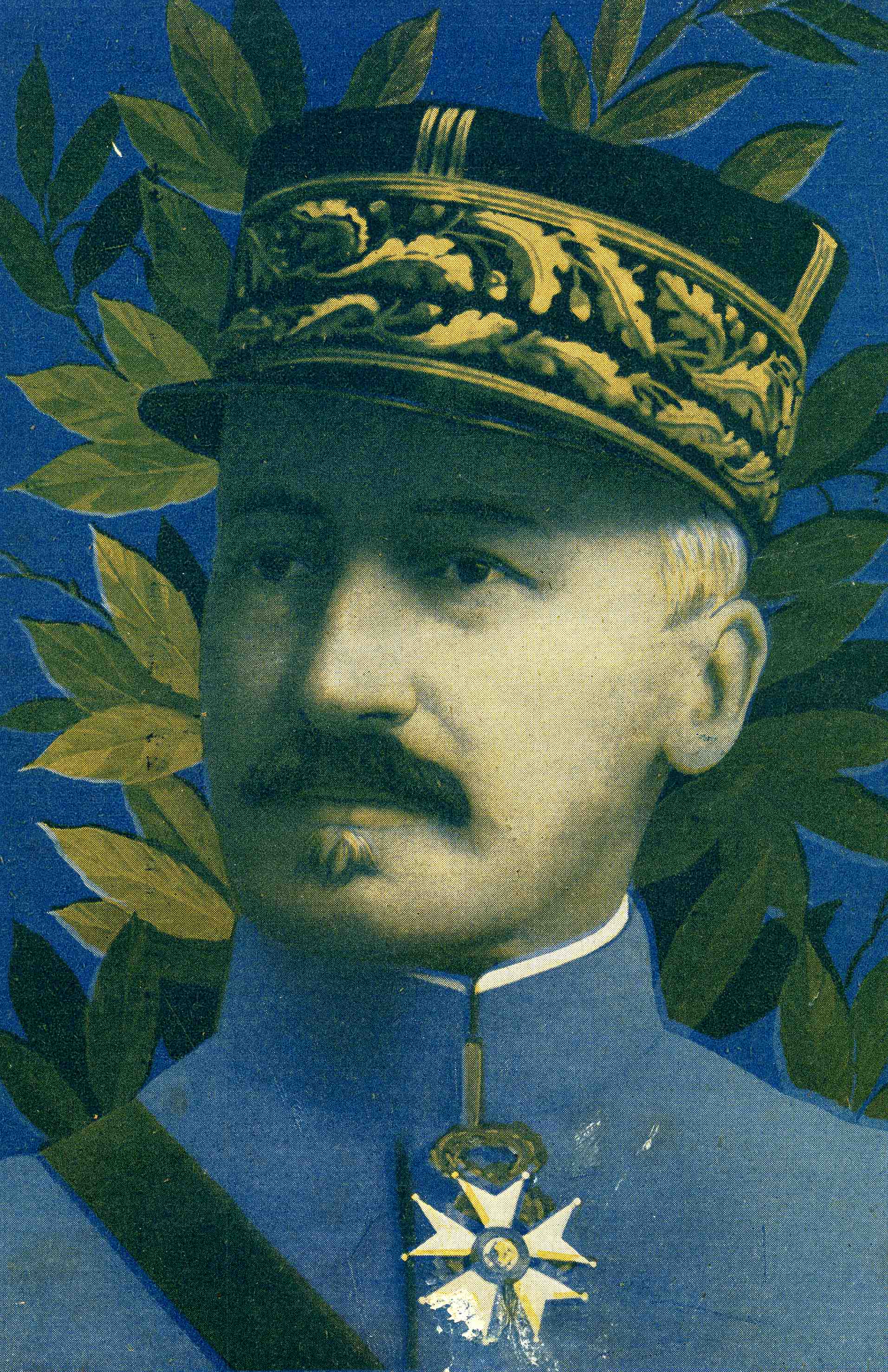
- Born: 29 December 1861; Paris, Seine, France
- Died: 10 May 1946 (aged 84); Paris, Seine, France
- Military career
- Allegiance: France
- Branch: French Army
- Service years: 1883–1919
- Rank: Général de Division
- Commands: 168th Infantry Regiment; 73rd Infantry Division; 39th Infantry Division; 7th Infantry Division
- Conflicts: World War I: Race to the Sea; Fighting at Bois-le-Prêtre; Second Battle of Ypres (WIA)
- Awards: Grand Officer of the Legion of Honor

Henri Marie Lebocq (1861–1946) was a French Général de Division of World War I. He commanded several regiments during the war and was notable for being the main French commander at the Fighting at Bois-le-Prêtre, leading the 73rd Infantry Division during the engagement. He was also a recipient of the Grand Cross of the Legion of Honour.

== Biography ==
Henri Lebocq was born on 29 December 1861 in Paris, within the 7th arrondissement. In 1883, he graduated from the École Spéciale Militaire de Saint-Cyr as a second lieutenant in the 11th Battalion of Alpine Chasseurs. In 1901, Lebocq was reported as a brevet captain of the 73rd Infantry Regiment.

In 1903 he became battalion commander and was promoted to Colonel in 1913. During the start of World War I, he was given command of the 73rd Infantry Division with a temporary promotion to Général de brigade. In October 1914, he was confirmed to remain as a Général de brigade. On 17 January 1915 Lebocq lead the 73rd Division at the Bois-le-Prêtre fighting against the 121st Division. Later on 2 May 1915, he is quoted at the order of the army but was wounded during the Second Battle of Ypres. Lebocq was named Commander of the Legion of Honor on 1 August 1917, and on 20 December 1917 he was promoted to Général de division and commanded the 39th Infantry Division with which he paraded in 1919 before President Raymond Poincaré and other politicians during the celebrations of his return from Metz to Paris. Before his retirement, Lebocq was a recipient of the Grand Cross of the Legion of Honour.

Lebocq died on 10 May 1946 in the 16th arrondissement of Paris.
