= Charles de Tricornot de Rose =

French Army pilot (1876–1916)

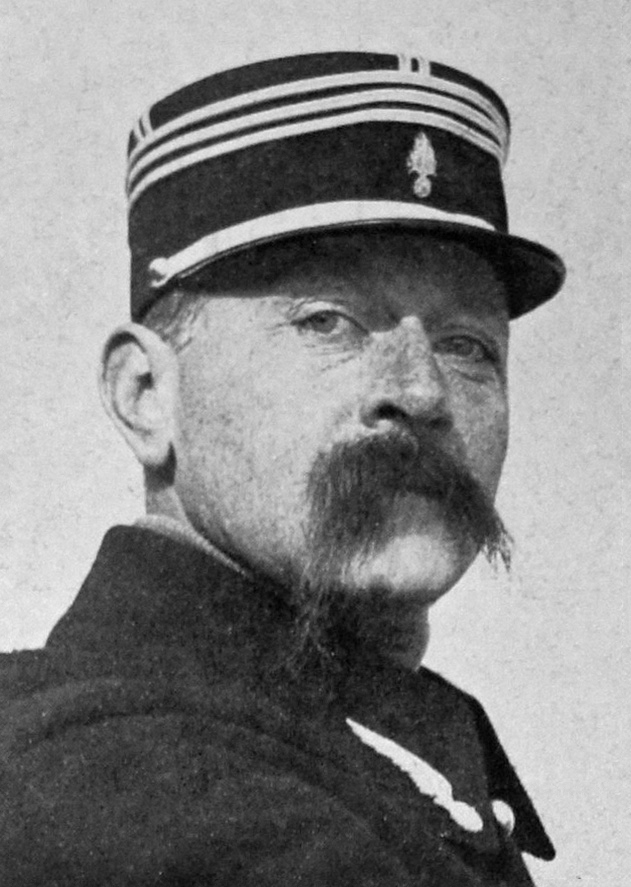
- Born: Jean Baptiste Marie Charles de Tricornot de Rose; 14 October 1876; Paris, France
- Died: 11 May 1916 (aged 39); Soissons, France
- Military career
- Allegiance: France
- Branch: French Army
- Service years: 1895–1906, 1909–1916
- Rank: Commandant
- Unit: 5th Army
- Conflicts: World War I; Battle of Verdun
- Awards: Légion d'Honneur

Jean Baptiste Marie Charles de Tricornot de Rose (French: [ʃaʁl də tʁikɔʁno də ʁoz]; 14 October 1876 – 11 May 1916) was a French Army pilot. He joined the French Army in 1895 and became a cavalry officer. During a three-year suspension, for refusing orders to enter churches in support of the 1905 French law on the Separation of the Churches and the State, de Rose became interested in aircraft. Upon his return to the army he attended a flying school and became the first holder of a French military pilot's licence. In the lead-up to the First World War Tricornot de Rose served under Jean Baptiste Eugène Estienne to develop French army aviation and experimented with mounting machine guns on aircraft.

During the war Tricornot de Rose first led a squadron and then the aircraft assigned to the 5th Army. He foresaw the importance of dedicated fighter aircraft and raised the first French fighter squadron in 1915. Tricornot de Rose played a key part in the early stage of the 1916 Battle of Verdun, using groups of aircraft and continuous patrolling to establish air superiority over the German forces. He died during a demonstration of flying near Soissons.

== Early life and career ==
Tricornot de Rose was born in Paris on 14 October 1876, the son of Jean-Baptiste Charles Emmanuel de Tricornot de Rose and Jeanne Marie Jacobé de Naurois. Although noble titles were not recognised in the French Third Republic, the family were descended from the holders of the titles of Baron de Tricornot and the Marquis de Rose and retained these designations as part of their surname. Tricornot de Rose joined the French Army as an officer cadet at Versailles on 31 August 1895 and attended the École spéciale militaire de Saint-Cyr. He was appointed a second lieutenant in the 9th Dragoon Regiment (9e régiment de dragons) on 1 August 1897, becoming the sixth generation of his family to have served as cavalry officers. He was promoted to lieutenant on 1 August 1899.

In early 1906 Tricornot de Rose's unit was ordered to secure some French villages during a period of political conflict between the government and the Roman Catholic church. This was a result of the 1905 French law on the Separation of the Churches and the State which brought all churches into public ownership. A staunch Catholic, Tricornot de Rose refused an order to enter churches to take an inventory. In a subsequent court martial he was sentenced to three years' suspension from the army, beginning on 20 April 1906. De Rose spent his suspension learning about aircraft and mechanics. He was married to Madeleine Tavernier on 10 November 1906; the couple lived at Fontainebleau. One of their sons was François de Tricornot de Rose, French ambassador to Portugal 1964–1970.

Tricornot de Rose returned from suspension on 29 March 1909 and was assigned to the 19th Dragoon Regiment (19e régiment de dragons). He was detached from his unit in 1910 to attend a flying school at Pau airfield. Tricornot de Rose received his civilian flying licence in late 1910 and, on 7 February 1911, was awarded the first French military pilot's licence. He afterwards worked under Colonel Jean Baptiste Eugène Estienne, an artillery officer who pioneered French military aviation as a spotting aid for his guns, at the headquarters in Vincennes. De Rose transferred to the 1st Engineer Regiment (1er régiment du génie) on 21 August 1911, in connection with his work in military aviation. He was appointed a Chevalier of the Légion d'honneur on 14 October 1911. During this period de Rose experimented with mounting machine guns onto the army's aircraft.

== First World War ==
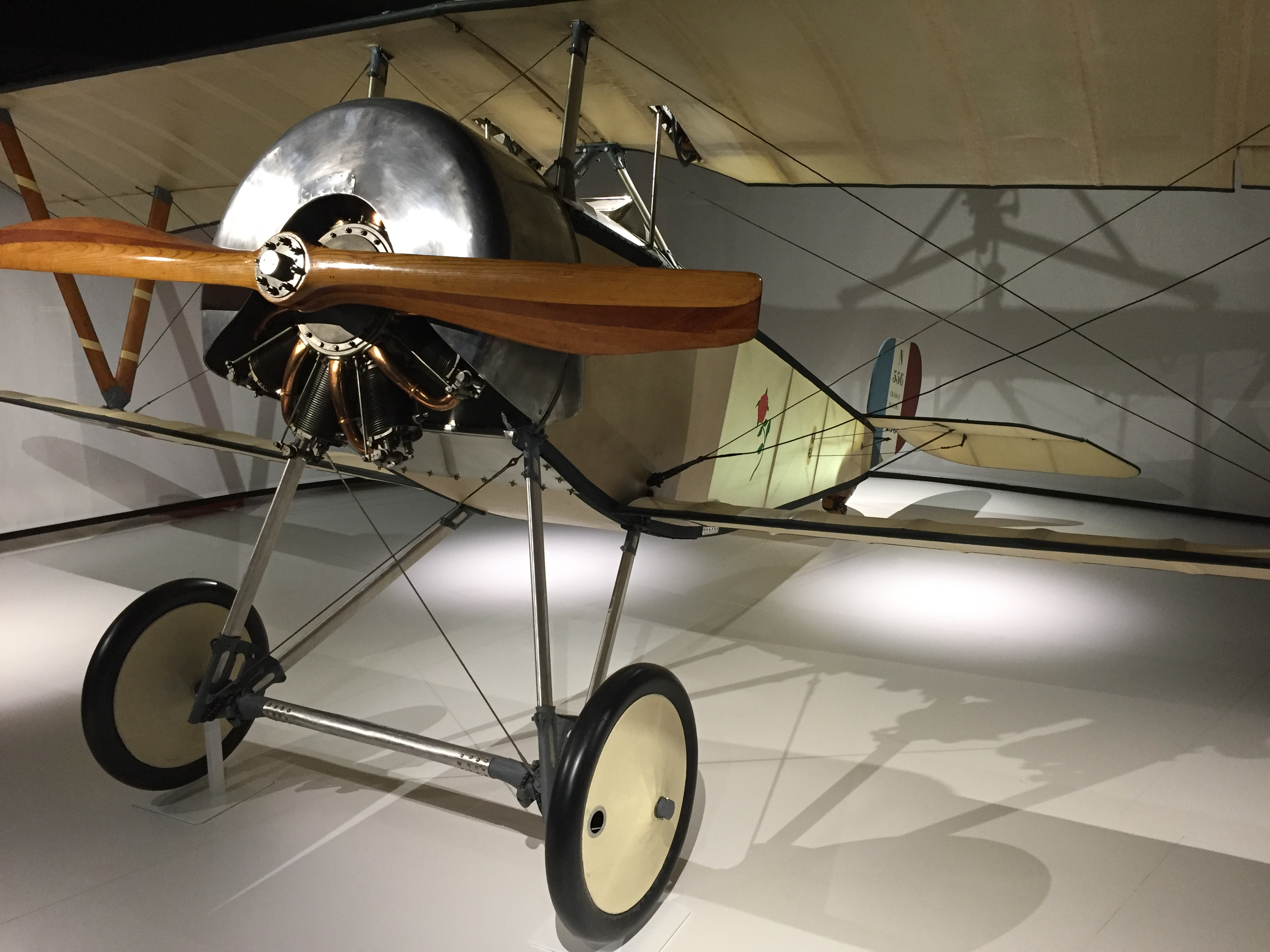
A Nieuport XI aircraft painted with de Tricornot de Rose's insignia of a red rose.

Shortly after the outbreak of the First World War in August 1914 de Rose was appointed to command the French Army's 12th Aircraft Squadron (Escadrille N 12). By this point he had been promoted to captain and, with Sergeant Roland Garros, resumed his experiments with aircraft-mounted weaponry, with trials of machine guns that fired through the propellor. In November Tricornot de Rose was appointed commander of aviation with the 5th Army (Ve Armée). Tricornot de Rose was one of the first to recognise the role dedicated fighter aircraft would play in war; they had hitherto been used mainly for reconnaissance. In Spring 1915 he organised the 12th Squadron as a unit dedicated to attacking enemy aircraft, becoming France's first fighter squadron. There was opposition from some French aviation officers who doubted the usefulness of such a unit.

Tricornot de Rose's fighter squadron was equipped with six two-seater Morane-Saulnier L aircraft, which was then the fastest and most manoeuvrable in French service. Nine of his twelve pilots and gunner/observers were drawn from the cavalry. Initially attacks were made by swooping onto the enemy from high altitude and shooting at them with a rifle from a range of 10 metres (33 ft). The unit's first kill was made on 1 April 1915 and by the end of the summer they had accounted for four German aircraft. Performance improved after the introduction of machine gun–equipped single-seater aircraft. Tricornot de Rose was appointed an Officer of the Legion d'honneur on 13 July 1915.

=== Verdun ===
At the beginning of the Battle of Verdun in February 1916, the French commander Philippe Pétain found his operations hampered due to losses of reconnaissance aircraft. He summoned Tricornot de Rose, by then a commandant (major), and granted him authority to do what was necessary to secure air superiority, telling him "de Rose, sweep the sky for me! I am blind! ... If we are chased out of the sky, then, it is simple, Verdun will be lost".

Tricornot de Rose was granted half of the French Army's fighter squadrons, equipped with the latest Nieuport biplanes, to form the first independent air unit in the French Army, the Combat Group (Groupement de combat). Tricornot de Rose ordered his men not to act alone or to seek one-on-one duels with German pilots, instead they were to operate in groups. He instigated training in group flying tactics and flight discipline. Initially the pilots operated in groups of three but this was expanded to groups of six and nine and eventually up to 25 aircraft operating in formation with fighter aces flying above. De Rose was keen to ensure a continuous presence in the air to deter German aircraft and instigated a series of patrols, rotating with fresh crews every three hours.

Tricornet de Rose also implemented other innovations such as improved air-to-ground coordination and aligning the boundaries of aerial sectors with those of the army corps on the ground. He also introduced the use of Le Prieur rockets and incendiary bullets to down German observation balloons. The Combat Group also pioneered methods of communication in the air by waggling the wings of their aircraft and for better control of the formation by its leader. Tricornot de Rose permitted his pilots to range far into German-occupied territory to extend air superiority. This led to complaints from the ground troops that they felt vulnerable to aerial attack as they could not see French planes and de Rose was forced to schedule additional patrols over friendly lines.

Tricornot de Rose quickly established air superiority and German artillery bombardments became less effective as they lost almost all access to aerial reconnaissance. The French Army was able to send up its own reconnaissance and artillery spotting aircraft, improving battlefield performance, and bomber aircraft were able to bring the German rear under attack. Following this success many of Tricornot de Rose's squadrons were withdrawn by the end of March to support other sectors, and he was posted away to command the aviation units supporting the 10th Army (Xe Armée) on the Artois front. At Verdun German aircraft soon made a reappearance, but measures taken by Tricornot de Rose's successor, Captain Auguste Le Révérend, restored French air superiority by May.

=== Death ===
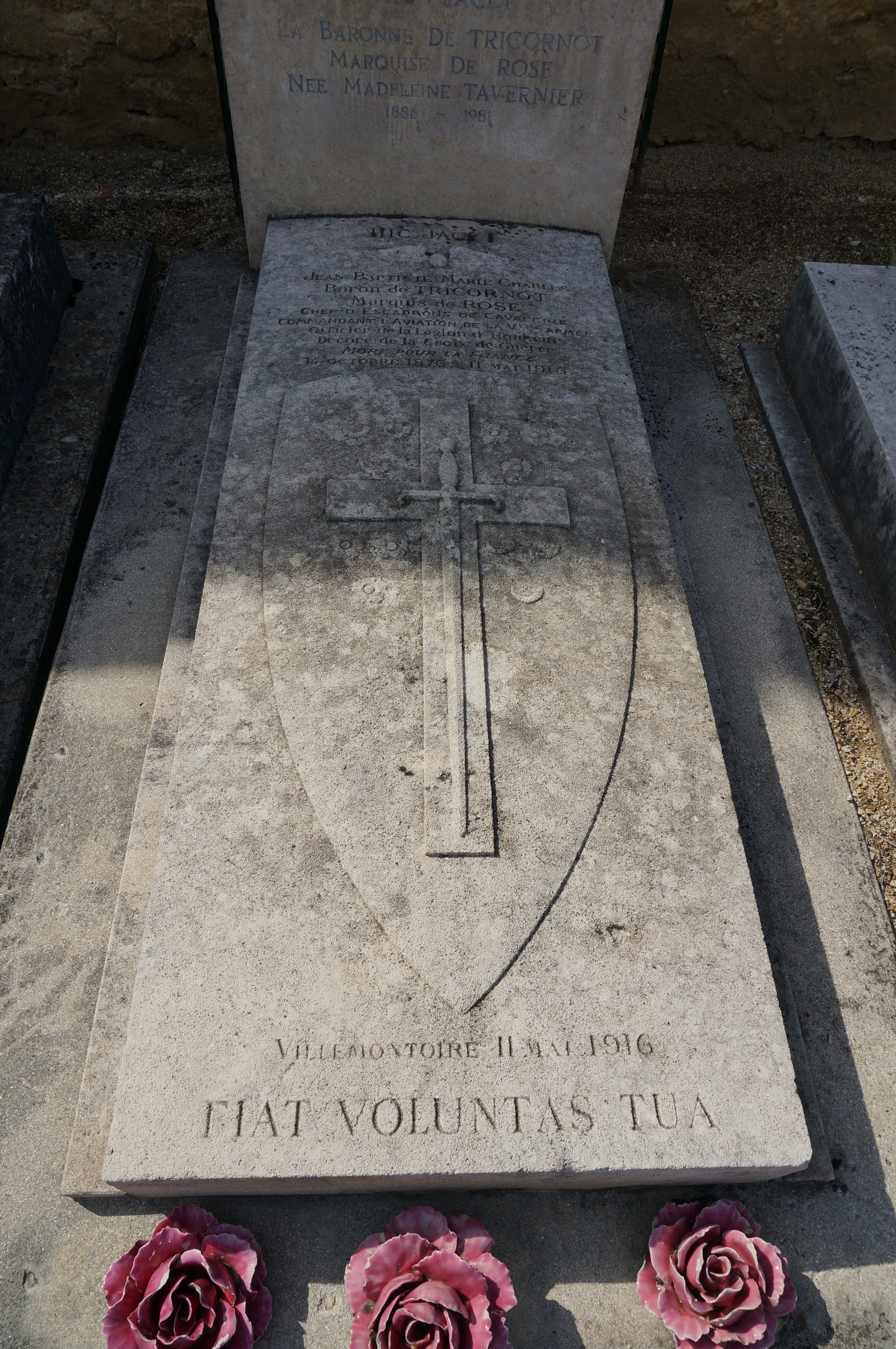
Grave

Tricornot de Rose died on 11 May 1916 during a demonstration flight near Soissons for General Paul François Grossetti. Tricornot de Rose cut his engine to perform a turn but found he was unable to restart it and crashed. At the time of his death he had received orders to replace Joseph Barès as chief of aviation at the Grand Quartier Général. Tricornot de Rose is buried in the communal cemetery at Jonchery-sur-Vesle and a nearby public space was named de Rose Square in his honour.

Tricornot de Rose has been described as "the father of French fighter aircraft" by French historian Pierre Razoux. The French air base at Dugny (now Paris–Le Bourget Airport) had a barracks named after Tricornot de Rose, it remains in use by the National Gendarmerie. The 1965 class of the École de l'air et de l'espace took its name from Tricornot de Rose. Graduates of the class, along with members of the Air Force general staff attended a ceremony at Jonchery's de Rose square on the centenary of his death.
