= Bois-le-Prêtre fighting =

1914-15 engagement of World War I in France

Fighting at Bois-le-Prêtre
- Part of Race to the Sea
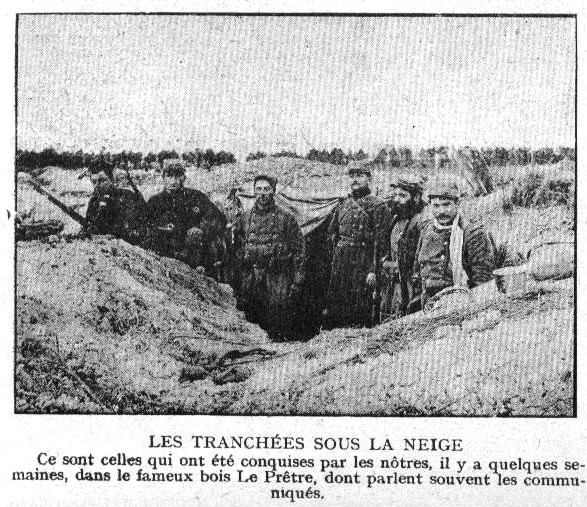
- Bois-le-Prêtre in 1915
Date	September 1914 to July 1915
Location	Pont-à-Mousson, Meurthe-et-Moselle, France 48°54′54″N 6°00′11″E
Result	Inconclusive

Belligerents
France	Germany

Commanders and leaders
Henri Lebocq	Kurt von Ditfurth

Units involved
167th Infantry Regiment; 168th Division; 73rd Division; 128th Division	121st Division

The Bois-le-Prêtre fighting (Priest's Wood, Priesterwald in German) was an engagement in the First World War between September 1914 and July 1915 involving the French 73rd Division and the 128th Division (the Wolves of Bois-le-Prêtre) and the German 121st Division.

== Situation ==
Bois le Prêtre is a Lorraine forest north-west of the town of Pont-à-Mousson, near the Moselle River. In 1914 German troops attacked the Verdun fortifications, a strongpoint inside the French defence lines.

== Facts ==
- The villages of Regniéville, Remenauville and Fey-en-Haye were destroyed.
- Bois-le-Pretre was one of the first missions of the volunteer American Ambulance's Field Service

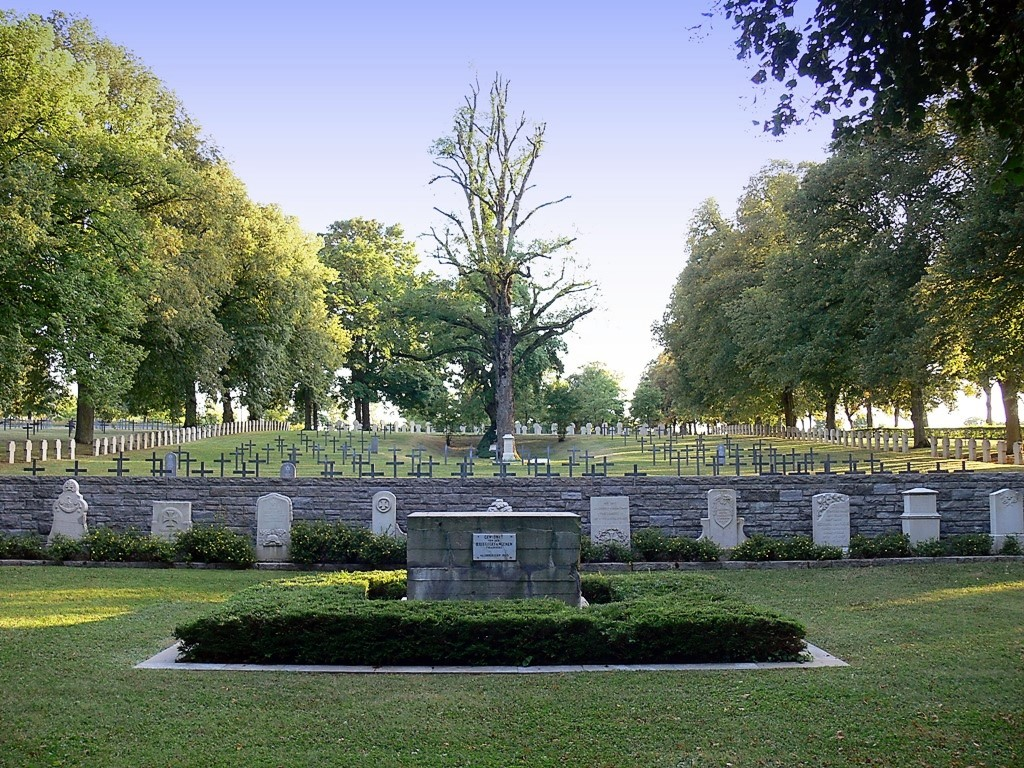
German cemetery (Thiaucourt-Regniéville)

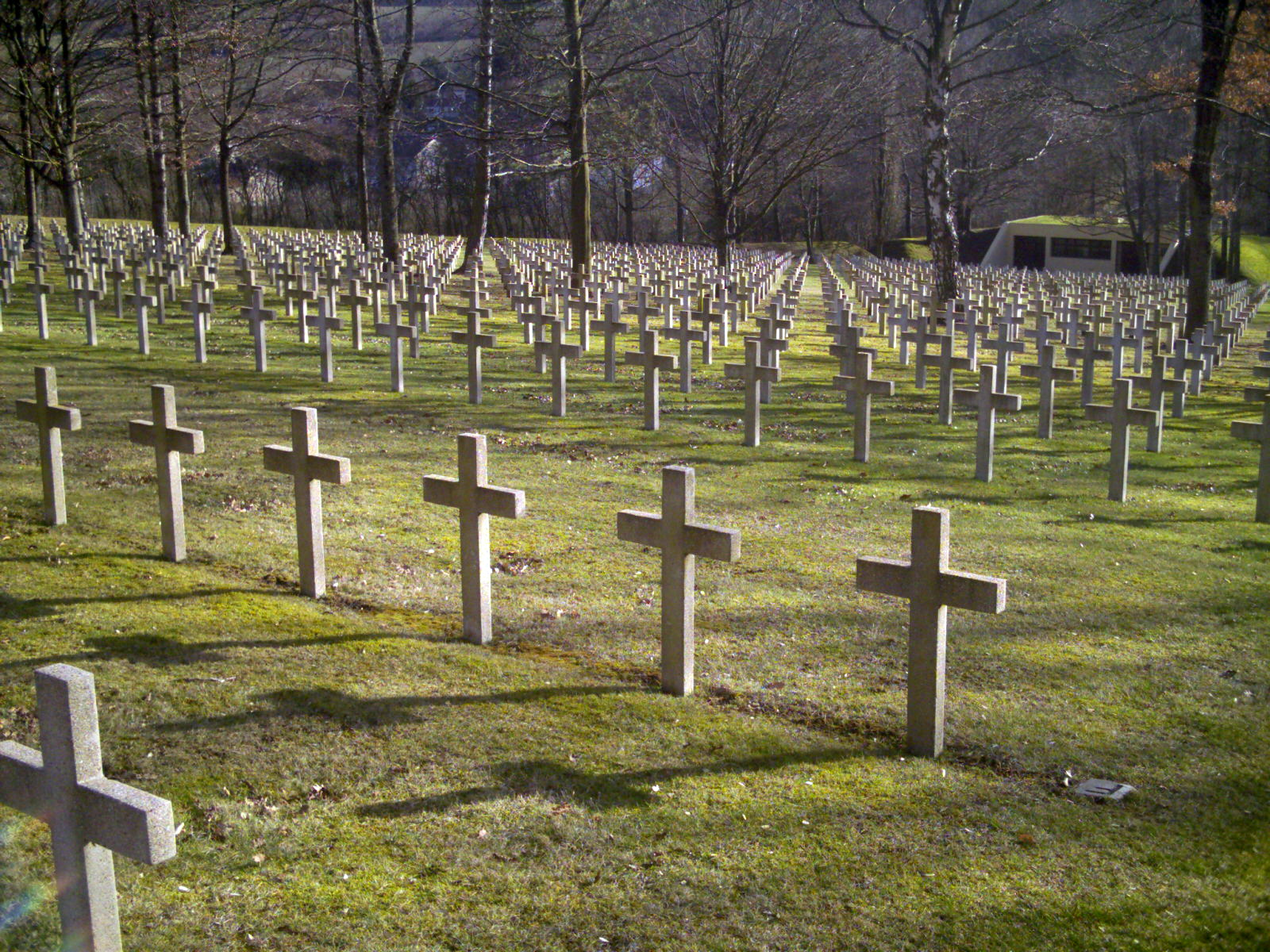
French Le Pétant cemetery (Montauville)

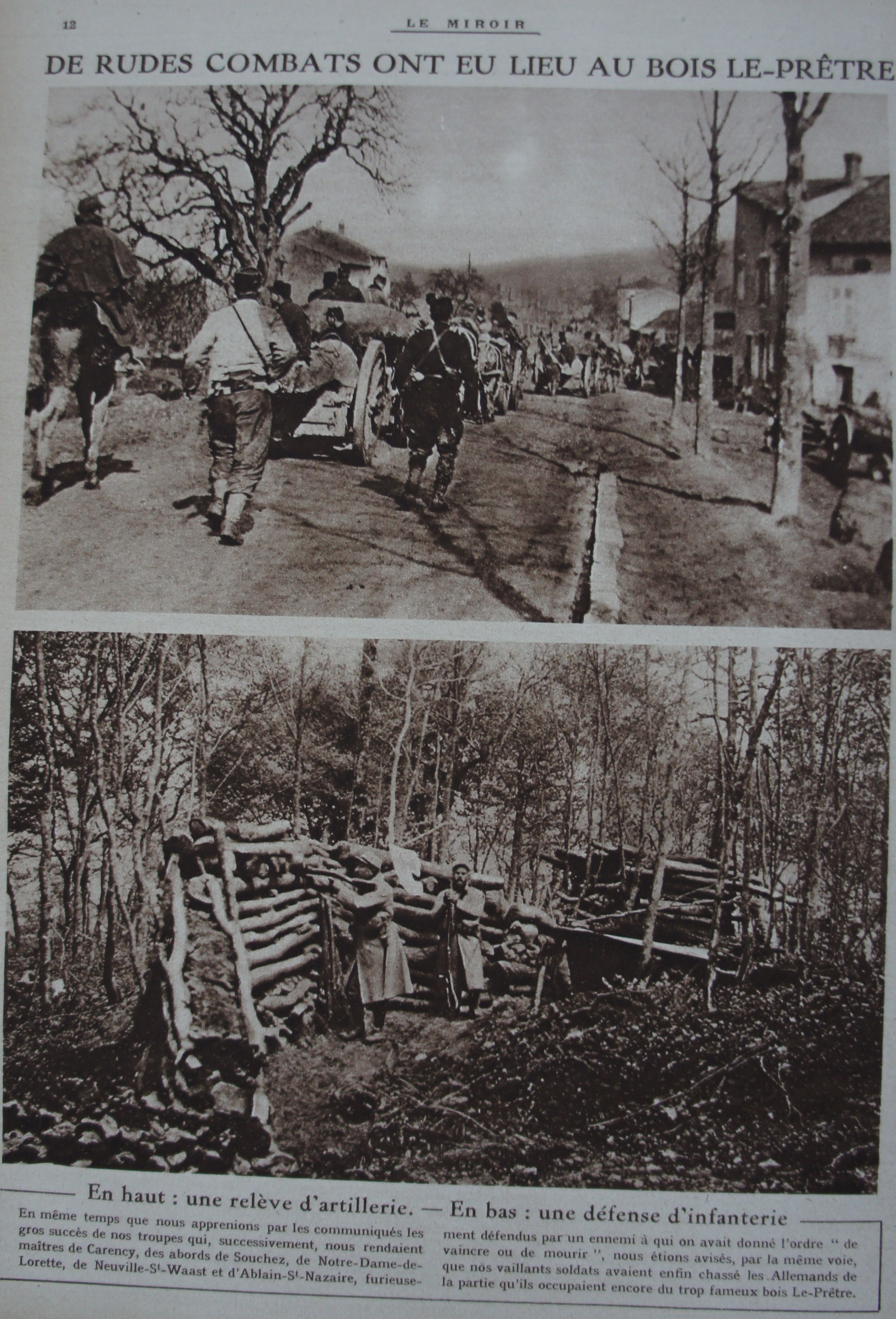
1915

== See also ==
- Battle of Grand Couronné
- Battle of Saint-Mihiel
