= Jean-Gabriel Thiébault =

Jean-Gabriel Thiébault (22 March 1783 – 24 January 1874) was a French military engineer under the First Empire and July Monarchy. He rose to the rank of general, was awarded the Saint Helena Medal, and under the restored monarchy was made a Knight of the Order of Saint Louis.

== Family ==
He was a son of Charles Gabriel Thiébault and Josèphe Rosalie Urbain. Charles was a lawyer to the parlement, royal counsellor and lieutenant to the royal provost-court and bailiff of Montmédy. In 1792, Charles-Gabriel was one of the two judges of the peace for the Montmédy district, in his case in charge of the town of Montmédy. Jean-Gabriel's paternal grandfather was Jean Thiébaul, husband of Barbe Ursule Carmouche, whilst his mother's brother was Gilles Urbain, curé of Montmédy.

Jean-Gabriel's brother Joseph Charles Auspice Thiébault was mayor of Thionville (1844–1861) and was made a Knight of the Legion of Honour in 1852. His sister Louise-Joseph-Madeleine-Victoire, married viscount Jean-Baptiste Jamin, a général de division, and their son Paul-Victor Jamin was put in command of the expedition to China.

== Life ==
=== Early life ===
He was born in Montmédy, with his paternal grandfather standing as godfather. He was educated by Gilles Urbain and abbé Bergnier, curé of Ville-es-Cloye. His good results at school gained him admission to France's École polytechnique aged sixteen with dispensation for age on 31 October 1801. · He graduated from it in 1803 and on 24 September moved to the school at Metz. Four years later he joined the army engineers and in 1806 he was posted to Luxembourg.

=== Peninsular War ===
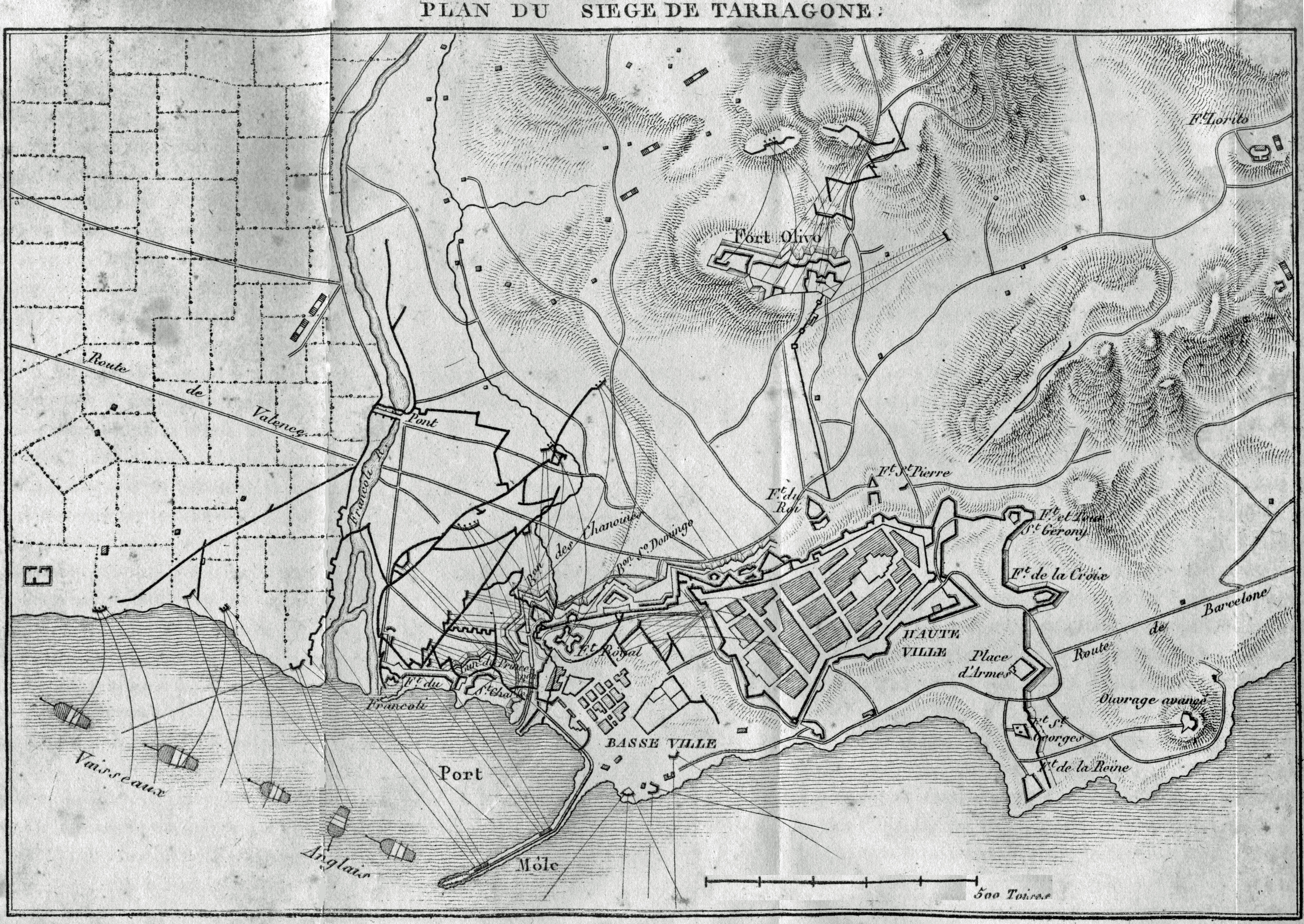
Siege of Tarragona

He was then sent to Spain and whilst with general Dupont's corps he was captured at the Battle of Bailén in July 1808 but freed shortly afterwards. He was promoted to captain, acted as aide de camp to general Joseph Rogniat and fought in several of the best-known sieges of the campaign, including those of Saguntum, Tortosa, Tarragona and Valencia.

It was at Tarragona on 21 June 1811 that he headed a party of fifty grenadiers, one of the five assault columns. He and his party managed to seize a semi-circular bastion then climb it into Fort Royal, pursue fleeing enemy troops and enter the San Domingo bastion. He was rewarded for this act of bravery with the equivalent of two months' extra pay and it was also mentioned in the Moniteur Universel At Valencia he served as a major and head of the attacking force.

Shortly after Tarragona he was given a brevet promotion as 'Chef de bataillon' in the engineers. He received one month's extra pay (333 francs in total) for bravery at the siege of Saguntum in October 1811. At the siege of Valencia, after the engineers colonel Henry was killed in the siegeworks, general Rogniat ordered Thiébault and Pinot (another 'chef de bataillon') to replace him.

=== 1813–1829 ===
He fought at the battle of Bautzen and became a lieutenant colonel before leading the defence of the river Elbe at the Battle of Dresden. He was captured by the Russians when they took Dresden and taken to Hungary, returning to France in 1814. He was put in command of the engineers at Sedan on 20 July 1814.

During the Hundred Days he supported Napoleon and fought at the battle of Waterloo as chief of the engineering staff of 3rd Corps. He remained in the army after the defeat and in 1816 was made chief military engineer for Verdun, where he proposed a new plan of fortifications which was welcomed by his superiors. He was made a colonel in 1825 and became the third commander of the 1st Engineer Regiment since it was raised in 1814.

Charles X reviewed two regiments in Arras in September 1827, the 12th Chasseur Regiment (commanded by the count of Maillé and based in the city's citadel) and the regiment under Thiébault's command. One newspaper noted:

His Majesty was able to most advantageously enjoy the military show prepared for him by the 1st Engineer Regiment, under the orders of Monsieur colonel Thiébault. On a stretch of ground they had built all the attacking works for one of the sides of a citadel. There were thirteen explosions in succession, both of fougasses and compression globes, which were able to give an idea of underground warfare, whose action is so powerful during sieges. The besieger and the besieged tried to succeed in turn, one by piercing the branches of his enemy's mines, the other by blowing up the siegeworks, crowned by the funnels produced by various explosions.

=== 1830–1874 ===
In 1831 he was made a Commander of the Legion of Honour · and in August that year he ceased to command that regiment, moving to Verdun as director of military engineering, succeeding colonel de Beaufort d'Hautpoul in that post on the latter's death. He next moved to head military engineering in Metz and Mézières, a command which also included the engineering school and arsenal in Metz, the 2nd Regiment of Engineers and a company of labourers.

He was then sent to Algeria, where he took part in the 1838 Siege of Constantine. He was replaced as director of fortifications in Africa by colonel Vaillant at his own request so that he could take up an equivalent post in mainland France. The same year he was put in charge of Lyon's fortifications, which he then began to construct. He then spent time as director of the 24th "Direction des fortifications", the one covering Paris, producing the new fortifications demanded by Adolphe Thiers and initially headed by general Dode de la Brunerie.

He was promoted to general on 22 January 1843 and a week later was posted to the Fortifications Committee . He was provisionally replaced as head of the Paris fortifications division by colonel Gilberton, who remained in post until colonel Cathala arrived. He was placed in the reserves on 23 March 1845, retired on 12 April 1848, but was recalled from retirement and placed back in the reserves (2nd section of the Army General Staff) on 23 January 1853 under Napoleon III's decree. He died at home at 23 rue de Miroménil in Paris aged 90 and was buried on 27 January 1874 – his pallbearers were generals Prudhon, Dubost and Durand-Devillers and colonel Merlin (from the 1st Engineer Regiment).

== Ranks ==
- 1808 : Captain
- 1813 : Lieutenant-Colonel
- 1825 : Colonel
- 1843 : General

== Bibliography ==
In French unless otherwise noted.

=== Biographies ===
- Vapereau, Gustave (1865). "Thiébault (Jean-Gabriel)". Dictionnaire universel des contemporains (3 ed.). Paris. p. 1712.
- Bonnabelle (1875). "Les comtes de Chiny et la ville de Montmédy". Mémoires de la Société des Lettres, Sciences et Arts de Bar-le-Duc (in French). Vol. 5. Bar-le-Duc: Contant-Laguerre. pp. 40, 64–65.
- Jeantin, Jean François Louis (1862). Manuel de la Meuse. Histoire de Montmédy et des localités meusiennes. Vol. 2. Nancy.
- Larousse, Pierre, ed. (1866). "Thiébault (Jean-Gabriel)". Grand dictionnaire universel du XIXe siècle. Vol. 15. Larousse. p. 123.
- Société Philomatique de Verdun (1953). "Thiébault (Jean-Gabriel)". Valeurs et Célébrités meusiennes. Verdun: Les éditions Lorraines Frémont. p. 195.
- Charles L. Leclerc (1975). "Thiébault (Jean-Gabriel)". Biographie des grands Lorrains. S.M.E.I. (Société messine d'éditions et d'impression). p. 207.

=== Obituaries ===
- "Ce qui se passe (nécrologie)". Le Gaulois. Vol. 7, no. 1934. Paris. 28 January 1874.
- "Mr le général Thiébault est mort hier soir". Le Figaro. Vol. 21, no. 26. Paris. 26 January 1874.
- 'Le général Thiébault', Le Petit Moniteur Universel, Paris, no 27, 27 January 1874, p. 2
- 'Gazette du Jour (nécrologie du général Thiébault)', La Presse, Paris, vol. 39th year, 27 January 1874, p. 3

=== Other ===
- Honoré Fisquet, Dictionnaire des célébrités de la France, vol. 651–655, A. Pilon, 1879, 914 p., p. 327
- (in English) Lawrence Barnett Phillips (1881). The Great Index of Biographical Reference. Gebble Company. p. 901.
- Suchet, Comte (8 July 1811), "« A.S. A.S. le prince de Neufchâtel et de Wagram »", La Gazette nationale ou le Moniteur universel
- Colson, Bruno (2006), Le général Rogniat ingénieur et critique de Napoléon, Paris: Economica
