= 121st Infantry Division (German Empire) =

121st Infantry Division (121. Infanterie-Division)
- Active: 1915–19
- Country: German Empire
- Branch: Army
- Type: Infantry
- Size: Approx. 12,500
- Engagements: World War I: Battle of Bois-le-Prêtre; Battle of Verdun; Battle of Passchendaele; German spring offensive; Second Battle of the Marne; Second Battle of the Somme (1918)

The 121st Infantry Division (121. Infanterie-Division) was a formation of the Imperial German Army in World War I. The division was formed on March 25, 1915, and organized over the next several weeks. It was part of a wave of new infantry divisions formed in the spring of 1915. The division was disbanded in 1919, during the demobilization of the German Army after World War I.

The division was formed primarily from the excess infantry regiments of regular infantry divisions that were being triangularized. The 60th Infantry Regiment was formerly part of the 31st Infantry Division, the 7th Reserve Infantry Regiment came from the 9th Reserve Division, and the 56th Reserve Infantry Regiment came from the 13th Reserve Division. The division was mainly composed of Westphalians.

== Combat chronicle ==
The 121st Infantry Division initially fought on the Western Front in World War I, entering the line in the Woëvre region at the beginning of May 1915. It remained in that area until March 1916, fighting in the Battle of Bois-le-Prêtre. It then fought in the Battle of Verdun. It briefly fought in the Battle of the Somme until July 18 when it was transferred to the Eastern Front, where it went into the line on the Styr River until the end of the year. It then went into the line near Lake Narač until May 1917, when it returned to the Western Front. It fought in the Battle of Passchendaele in late 1917, and saw action in the Second Battle of the Marne and the Second Battle of the Somme, also known as the Third Battle of the Somme, in 1918. It remained in the line until the end of the war. Allied intelligence rated the division as third class.

== Order of battle on formation ==
The 121st Infantry Division was formed as a triangular division. The order of battle of the division on March 25, 1915, was as follows:

- 241. Infanterie-Brigade
  - Reserve-Infanterie-Regiment Nr. 7
  - Reserve-Infanterie-Regiment Nr. 56
  - Infanterie-Regiment Markgraf Carl (7. Brandenburgisches) Nr. 60
- 2.Eskadron/Jäger-Regiment zu Pferde Nr. 12
- 3.Eskadron/Jäger-Regiment zu Pferde Nr. 12
- Feldartillerie-Regiment Nr. 241
- Fußartillerie-Batterie Nr. 121
- Pionier-Kompanie Nr. 241

== Late-war order of battle ==
The division underwent relatively few organizational changes over the course of the war. Cavalry was reduced, artillery and signals commands were formed, and combat engineer support was expanded to a full pioneer battalion. The order of battle on April 1, 1918, was as follows:

- 241. Infanterie-Brigade
  - Reserve-Infanterie-Regiment Nr. 7
  - Reserve-Infanterie-Regiment Nr. 56
  - Infanterie-Regiment Markgraf Carl (7. Brandenburgisches) Nr. 60
- 2.Eskadron/Jäger-Regiment zu Pferde Nr. 12
- Artillerie-Kommandeur 121
  - Feldartillerie-Regiment Nr. 241
  - Fußartillerie-Bataillon Nr. 85
- Pionier-Bataillon Nr. 121
  - Pionier-Kompanie Nr. 241
  - Pionier-Kompanie Nr. 260
  - Minenwerfer-Kompanie Nr. 121
- Divisions-Nachrichten-Kommandeur 121
