= Vadenay =

- Commune
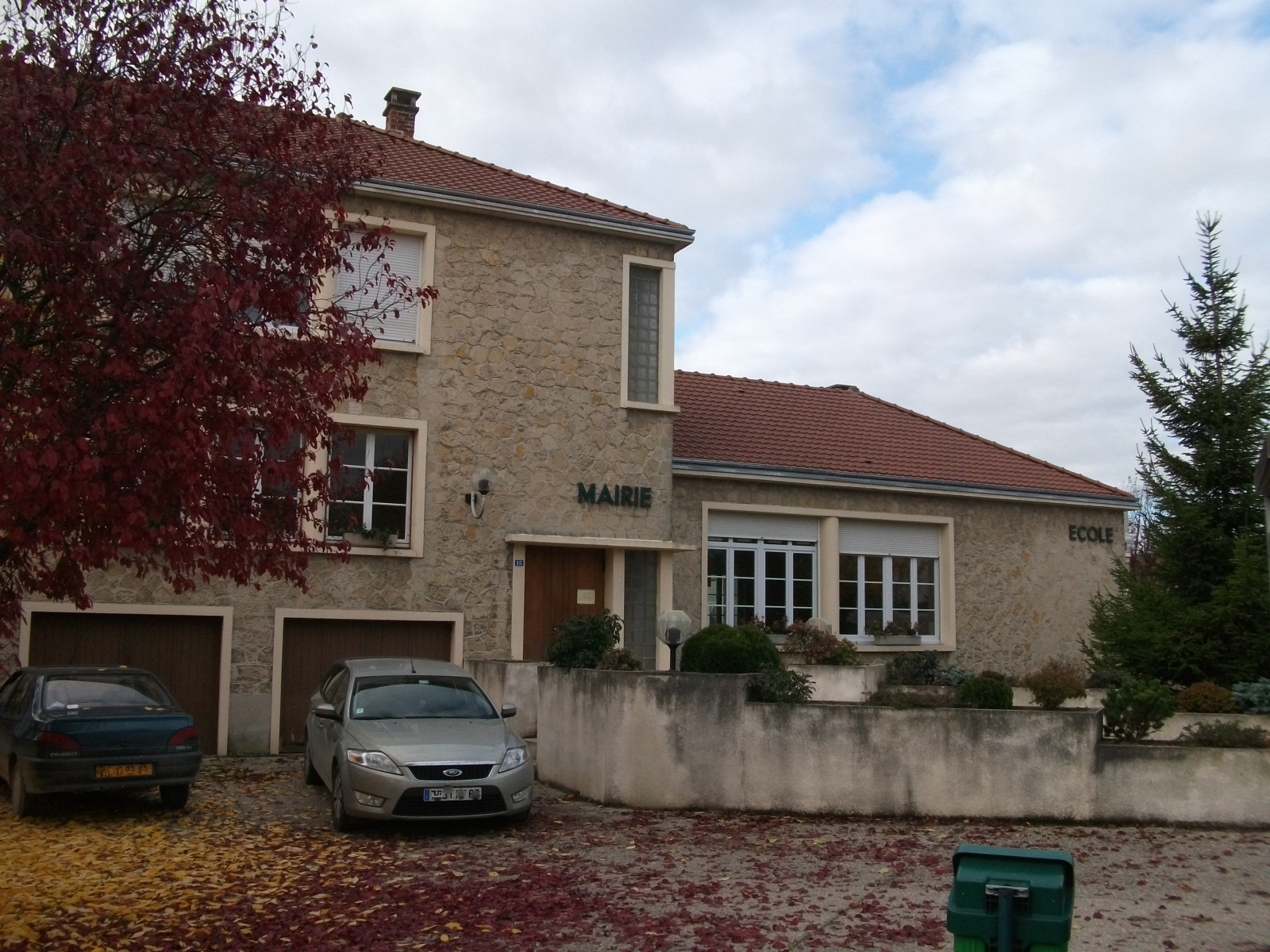
- The town hall in Vadenay
- Location of Vadenay
- Location within France Location within Grand Est
- Coordinates: 49°04′21″N 4°24′02″E
- Country: France
- Region: Grand Est
- Department: Marne
- Arrondissement: Châlons-en-Champagne
- Canton: Mourmelon-Vesle et Monts de Champagne
- Intercommunality: CA Châlons-en-Champagne

Government
  - Mayor (2020–2026): Bertrand Dubois
- Area^{1}: 19.65 km^{2} (7.59 sq mi)
- Elevation: 126 m (413 ft)
- Population (2023): 233
  - Density: 11.9/km^{2} (30.7/sq mi)
- Time zone: UTC+01:00 (CET)
  - Summer (DST): UTC+02:00 (CEST)
- INSEE/Postal code: 51587 /51400
- ^{1} French Land Register data, which excludes lakes, ponds, glaciers > 1 km^{2} (0.386 sq mi or 247 acres) and river estuaries.

Vadenay (French pronunciation: [vadnɛ]) is a commune in the Marne department in north-eastern France.

== See also ==
- Communes of the Marne department
