= Haudiomont =

- Commune
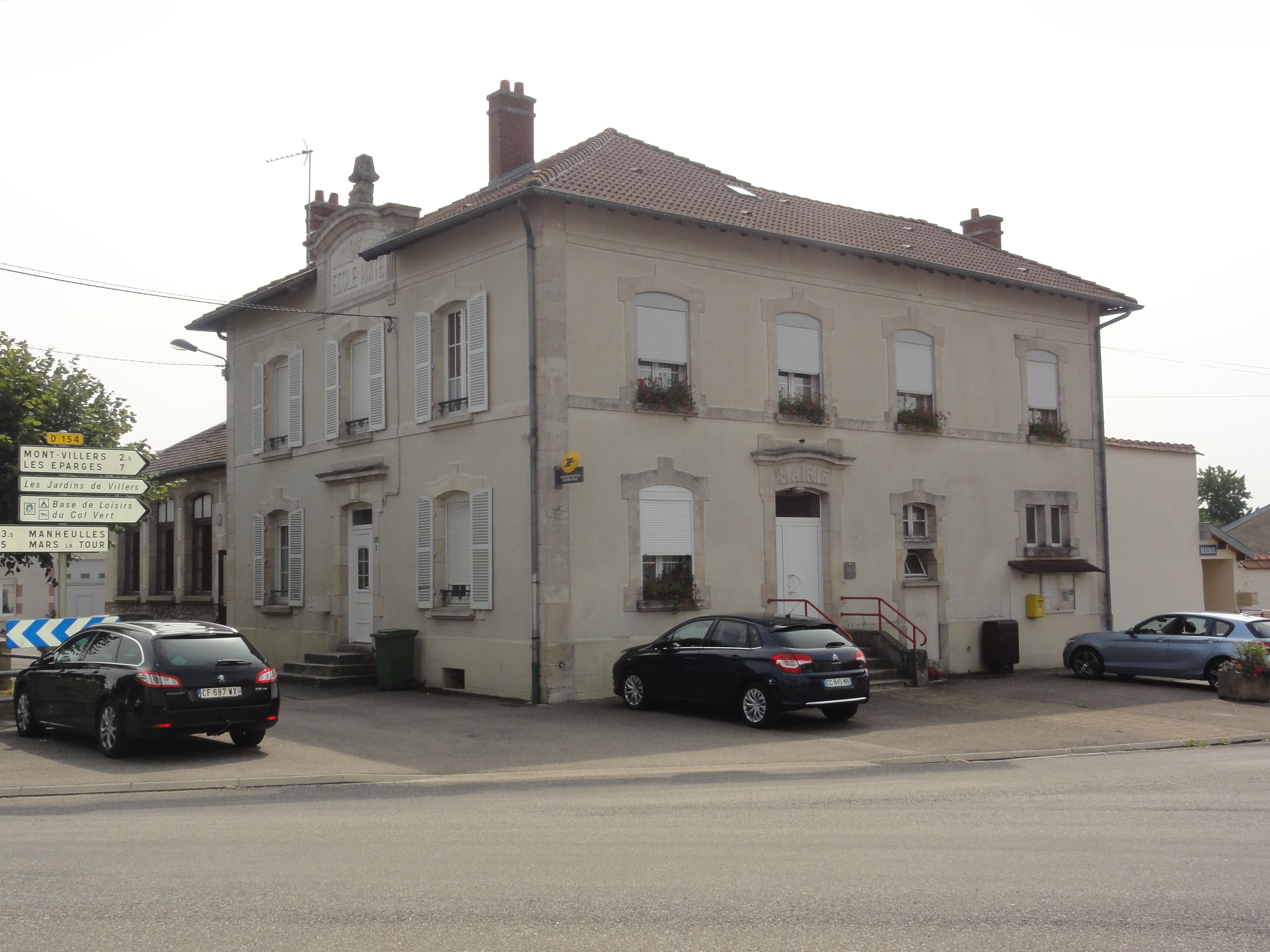
- The town hall in Haudiomont
- Location of Haudiomont
- Location within France Location within Grand Est
- Coordinates: 49°06′59″N 5°33′38″E
- Country: France
- Region: Grand Est
- Department: Meuse
- Arrondissement: Verdun
- Canton: Étain
- Intercommunality: Territoire de Fresnes-en-Woëvre

Government
  - Mayor (2020–2026): Eric Parant
- Area^{1}: 9.3 km^{2} (3.6 sq mi)
- Elevation: 263 m (863 ft)
- Highest elevation: 393 m (1,289 ft)
- Lowest elevation: 219 m (719 ft)
- Population (2023): 232
  - Density: 25/km^{2} (65/sq mi)
- Time zone: UTC+01:00 (CET)
  - Summer (DST): UTC+02:00 (CEST)
- INSEE/Postal code: 55237 /55160
- ^{1} French Land Register data, which excludes lakes, ponds, glaciers > 1 km^{2} (0.386 sq mi or 247 acres) and river estuaries.

Haudiomont (French pronunciation: [odjɔmɔ̃]) is a commune in the Meuse department of Grand Est in north-eastern France.

== See also ==
- Communes of the Meuse department
- Parc naturel régional de Lorraine
