= 102nd Infantry Regiment (France) =

102nd Infantry Regiment, or 102e Régiment d'Infanterie de Ligne
- Active: 1677-
- Country: France
- Branch: French Army
- Type: Regiment of Infantry
- Role: Infantry of the Line
- Garrison/HQ: .
- Motto(s): Ex serviture libertas
- Anniversaries: Saint-Maurice
- Decorations: Décoré de la Croix de guerre 1914-1918 avec deux citations à l'ordre de l'armée Il a le droit au port de la fourragère aux couleurs de ruban de la croix de guerre 1914-1918.
- Battle honours: Valmy 1792; Zurich 1799; Wagram 1809; Battle of Taku Forts (1860); L'Ourcq 1914; Reims 1918; Somme-Py 1918

The 102nd Infantry Regiment (French: 102e Régiment d'Infanterie, 102e RI) was an infantry regiment of the French Revolutionary Wars and the Napoleonic Wars. Reconstituted several times in the 19th century, it took part in the Second Opium War in China, then in the First and Second World Wars, being disbanded in 1940.

== French Royal Army ==
Its ancestor regiments were the Infantry Regiment of the Line Le Dauphin (Nr. 29) and Royal-Deux Ponts (Nr 99). The regiment was raised in 1667 by Michel De Fisicat, as Le Dauphin (nr. 29) and on 26 April 1775 split into two regiments. The 1st and 3rd battalions retained the old title and number and the 2nd and rth battalions became the new infantry regiment Perche (Nr 30).

== The Revolutionary Wars as Infantry Regiment of the Line Perche (Nr 30) ==
=== Campaigns ===
Flag of the regiment

Initially, the regiment served in the Army of the Center, at Metz. Following the Battle of Valmy on 20 September 1792, the regiment was assigned to the Army of the Ardennes. In 1793, the regiment saw action in the Meuse campaign. In 1794, it underwent its first amalgamation (17 May), under the Levée en Masse, and became the 2nd battalion 59th Demi-Brigade of Battle, with the 4th battalion, Volunteers of Paris, also called 'l'Oratoire and the 7th battalion of the Rhône-et-Loire, in the Army of the Moselle.

Colonels of the Revolutionary Period

- Henri François Thibaut de La Carte, Comte de La Ferté-Sennectère (10 March 1788)
- Olivier Victor de Baudre (21 October 1791)
- Germain Félix Tennet de Laubadère (26 October 1792)
- Alexandre Alexis Dumas (8 March 1793)
- Jean Baptiste Brunet (25 germinal an IV)

In 1797, the regiment was part of the Armée de Sambre-et-Meuse. In 1798, as part of the Army of Germany and the Army of Mayence (Mainz), the Regiment saw action in the Rhineland. In 1799, as part of the Army of Mayence, it was transferred to the Army of the Danube, under the general command of Jean-Baptiste Jourdan; the regiment was part of the I Division, under the immediate command of Pierre Marie Barthélemy Ferino, and participated in action at the Battle of Ostrach (20–21 March 1799), and the Battle of Stockach, 25–26 March 25–26, 1799. On 25 September 1799, the regiment fought at the Battle of Zurich.

Battle of Caldiero

== The Napoleonic Wars ==
=== War Of The Third Coalition ===
Battle of Austerlitz

=== War of the Fourth Coalition ===
Battle of Halle
Battle of Lübeck
Battle of Mohrungen
Battle of Friedland
Battle of Schleiz

=== The Peninsular war ===
Dos de Mayo Uprising
Battle of Zornoza
Battle of Valmaseda
Battle of Espinosa
Battle of Talavera
Battle of Fuentes de Oñoro
Battle of Arroyo dos Molinos
Battle of Maya
Occupation of Pamplona,
Battle of the Bidassoa (1813), Spelleto, and
Battle of Bayonne

=== War of the Fifth Coalition ===
Battle of Essling
Battle of Wagram

=== War of the Sixth Coalition ===
Siege of Danzig, Wurschen, Gieshubel,
Battle of Dresden, Grieffenberg, Elsen,
Battle of Dohna,
Battle of Bautzen
Siege of Genoa (1814) 2 battalions present

=== War of the Seventh Coalition ===
Battle of Lille
Battle of Courtrai

== Greek War of Independence ==
=== The Morea expedition ===
1828 : Expédition de Morée

== Sources ==
=== Bibliography ===
- Historique du 102ème régiment d'infanterie 1914-1918 (PDF) (in French). Paris: Librairie Chapelot. 1920. BDIC_O_007864 – via Université Paris Nanterre.
- Lacolle, Noël (1896). Histoire du 102e régiment d'infanterie 1792-1896 (in French). Mayenne: Imprimerie Poirier-Bealu. FRBNF34076599 – via Bibliothèque nationale de France.
- Smith, Digby (2000). Napoleon's Regiments: Battle histories of the Regiments of the French Army, 1792-1815. London: Greenhill. ISBN 978-1-85-367413-6.
