= Courtisols =

- Commune
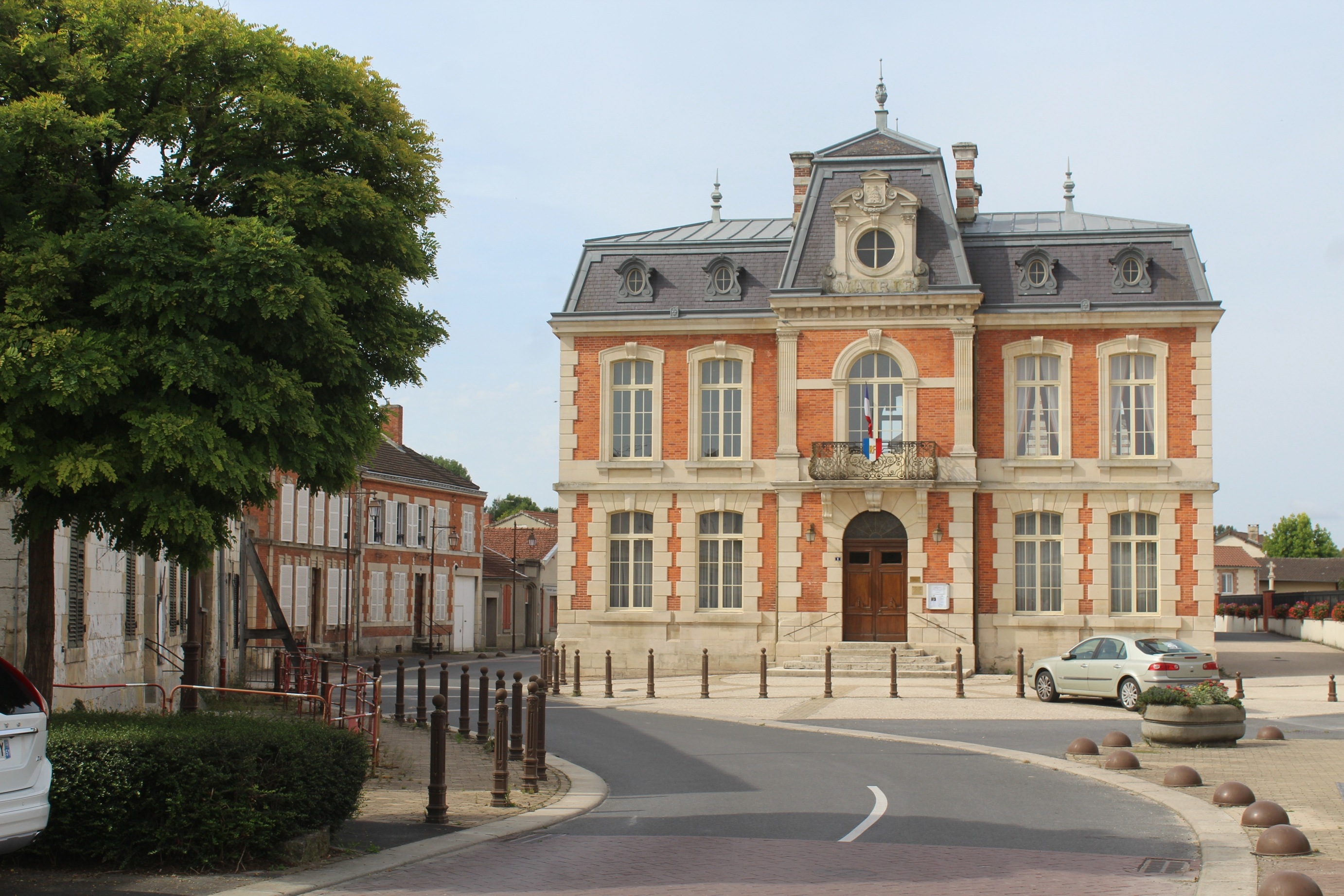
- The town hall in Courtisols

- Coat of arms
- Location of Courtisols
- Location within France Location within Grand Est
- Coordinates: 48°59′11″N 4°31′39″E
- Country: France
- Region: Grand Est
- Department: Marne
- Arrondissement: Châlons-en-Champagne
- Canton: Argonne Suippe et Vesle
- Intercommunality: CC de la Moivre à la Coole

Government
  - Mayor (2020–2026): Milène Adnet
- Area^{1}: 65.62 km^{2} (25.34 sq mi)
- Elevation: 141 m (463 ft)
- Population (2023): 2,343
  - Density: 35.71/km^{2} (92.48/sq mi)
- Time zone: UTC+01:00 (CET)
  - Summer (DST): UTC+02:00 (CEST)
- INSEE/Postal code: 51193 /51460
- ^{1} French Land Register data, which excludes lakes, ponds, glaciers > 1 km^{2} (0.386 sq mi or 247 acres) and river estuaries.

Courtisols (French pronunciation: [kuʁtizɔl]) is a commune in the Marne department in north-eastern France, 13 kilometres (8 miles) east of Chalons-sur-Marne.

== Population ==
Historical population
Year	Pop.	±% p.a.
1968	1,287	—
1975	1,615	+3.30%
1982	2,202	+4.53%
1990	2,400	+1.08%
1999	2,586	+0.83%
2007	2,581	−0.02%
2012	2,482	−0.78%
2017	2,425	−0.46%
2023	2,343	−0.57%
Source: INSEE

== See also ==
- Communes of the Marne department
