= 1st Engineer Regiment (France) =

- 1er régiment du génie
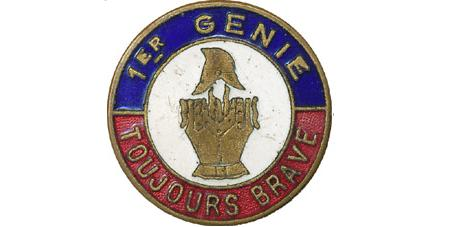
- Active: 1814–24 June 2010
- Allegiance: France
- Branch: Army
- Type: engineers
- Garrison/HQ: Illkirch-Graffenstaden (just before its disbandment)
- Motto: "Toujours Brave" (Always Brave)
- Battle honours: Fleurus 1794; Antwerp 1832; Constantine 1837; Sebastopol 1854-55; Far East 1884-1885; La Marne 1914; Champagne 1915-1918; Verdun-Argonne 1915-1918; Italy 1943-1944; Rhine 1945

The 1st Engineer Regiment (1er régiment du génie) was an engineers' regiment in the French Army. Created on 12 May 1814 as the 1st Sapper-Miner Regiment (1er régiment de Sapeurs-Mineurs), it was retained after the Second Restoration and licensed on 26 July 1815.

On 1 October 1816 it became the 1st Metz Engineer Regiment (régiment du génie de Metz), before being given its final name in 1820. It was dissolved in 1940 but re-raised on 1 February 1946 as the 1st Engineer Regiment by renumbering the existing 101st Engineer Regiment, whose traditions it inherited. It was named the 1st Engineer Regiment until its disbandment on 24 June 2010, apart from for a brief period as the 1st Engineer Training Regiment (1er régiment d'instruction du génie or 1 RIG).

It was traditionally based in the garrison at Strasbourg but before its disbandment it was based in the Leclerc district of Illkirch-Graffenstaden.

== Commanders ==
- 1814-1815 : Colonel Jean-Baptiste Lamare
- 1816-1825 : Colonel Ambroise Prost (Note: The 'régiment de Metz du corps royal du génie' was renamed the 1st Engineer Regiment in 1820.)
- 1825-1831 : Colonel Jean-Gabriel Thiébault (*)
- 1831-1833 : Colonel Repecaud
- 1833-1838 : Colonel Audoy (*)
- 1838-1841 : Colonel Guillemain (*)
- 1841-1844 : Colonel Dupont de l'Estang
- 1844-1848 : Colonel Charles Paulin
- 1848-1853 : Colonel Boutault (*)
- 1859 : Colonel Jourjon (Note: Killed on 24 June 1859 at the battle of Solférino)
- 1859-1864 : Colonel Prudon (*)
- 1864-1868 : Colonel Dubost (*)
- 1868-1874 : Colonel François-Xavier Merlin
- 1874-1876 : Colonel Salanson (*)
- 1876-1879 : Colonel Pleuvier (*)
- 1879-1880 : Colonel Histin (*)
- 1880-1882 : Colonel de Bussy (*)
- 1882-1883 : Colonel Richard (*)
- 1883-1884 : Colonel Guichard (*)
- 1884-1885 : Colonel Mensier (*)
- 1885-1887 : Colonel Lallemant (*)
- 1887-1889 : Colonel Quinivet (*)
- 1889-1891 : Colonel Bouvier (*)
- 1891-1892 : Colonel Tartrat
- 1892-1894 : Colonel François Derendinger (**)
- 1894-1897 : Colonel Perboyre
- 1897-1900 : Colonel Bouic
- 1900-1902 : Colonel Tetard
- 1902-1904 : Colonel Lheritier
- 1904-1906 : Colonel Thevenet
- 1906-1910 : Colonel Fournier (*)
- 1910-1912 : Colonel Cauboue
- 1912-1913 : Colonel Tatin
- 1913-1914 : Colonel Dehoey
- 1920-1922 : Colonel Labadie
- 1922-1924 : Colonel Hure
- 1924-1926 : Colonel Lagarde
- 1926-1927 : Colonel Louis Chauvineau (**)
- 1927-1928 : Colonel Ballis
- 1928-1929 : Colonel Grenet
- 1929-1931 : Colonel Lemoine
- 1931-1934 : Colonel Paul Drome (*)
- 1934-1936 : Colonel Lazard
- 1936-1937 : Colonel Wernert
- 1937-1940 : Colonel Auguste Reverdy (Note: Became a prisoner of war in 1940.)
- 1940-1942 : Lieutenant-Colonel Cueff (*) (Note: Commanding 1st Engineer Regiment in the Armée d'armistice, heir to the 1st Engineer Regiment. Insignia incorrect (see 1st Engineer Battalion in the Free French Forces.)
- 1944-1946 : Colonel Jean-Gabriel Ythier (*)
- 1946-1950 : Colonel Jean Mandaroux (*)
- 1950-1952 : Colonel Frédéric-Étienne Langlet (**)
- 1952-1954 : Colonel Robert Prieur (***)
- 1954-1956 : Colonel Robert
- 1956 : Colonel François Guelfi (*)
- 1956-1957 : Colonel Paul Cayatte
- 1957-1959 : Colonel Jean Nouqueret
- 1959 : Colonel Michel Lafferrerie (**)
- 1959-1960 : Colonel René Antoine
- 1960-1961 : Colonel Hym
- 1961-1964 : Colonel Constantin Vidal
- 1964-1966 : Colonel Robert Riche
- 1966-1969 : Colonel Jean Chevalier
- 1969-1971 : Colonel Jacques Delplancq (*)
- 1971-1973 : Colonel Jean Arnoux
- 1973-1976 : Colonel Jean Maison (**)
- 1976-1978 : Colonel Bernard Rigal (*)
- 1978-1980 : Colonel Bernard Putigny (*)
- 1980-1982 : Colonel Pierre Stehlin (**)
- 1982-1984 : Colonel Jean-Paul Rœlly
- 1984-1986 : Colonel Armand Mandra
- 1986-1988 : Colonel Roland Sautel
- 1988-1991 : Colonel Jacques Fabre
- 1991-1993 : Colonel Luc Ozaneaux
- 1993-1995 : Colonel Georges Kuttlein
- 1995-1997 : Colonel Jean-Michel Sandeau (**)
- 1997-1999 : Colonel Huguet (*)
- 1999-2001 : Colonel Bernard Bruder (***)
- 2001-2003 : Colonel Albacete
- 2003-2005 : Colonel Pascal Kerouault (*)
- 2005-2007 : Colonel Jean-Jacques Soucasse
- 2007-2009 : Colonel Jean-Denis Berthon (*)
- 2009-2010 : Colonel François Eglemme

(*) Officer who later became a général de brigade. (**) Officer who later became a général de division. (***) Officer who later became général de corps d'armée.

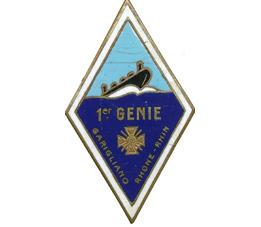
Regimental insignia of the 1st Engineer Regiment.

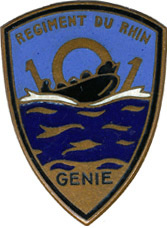
Regimental insignia of the 101st Engineer Regiment.

== Motto ==
Its motto was "Toujours brave" (always brave).

== Bibliography (in French) ==
- Historique des 1e et 21e régiments du génie available at Gallica Jupas et Madard. Campagne 1914-1918 1er et 21e Régiment du Génie. (Consultable à la bibliothèque du Ministère de la défense du Fort de Vincennes).
- Précis des unités du Génie de 1793 à 1993 (ND) par le Cne(er) Giudicelli et le Maj(er) Dupire.
- "Manuel complet de fortification par H. Plessix et É. Legrand-Girarde. 3rd édition 1909" la 4e partie, page 743 et suivante, trait de l'organisation du Génie, des missions et travaux du Génie.
- Historiques des corps de troupe de l'armée française (1569-1900)

== External links (in French) ==
- 1er R.G
- Relation du sauvetage d'un puisatier à La Coudraye, Eure-et-Loir, par un détachement du 1er régiment du génie - source: Bibliothèque nationale de France
