= Canton of Neufchâtel-sur-Aisne =

Coordinates: 49°26′N 4°02′E

Neufchâtel-sur-Aisne
- Former canton
- Interactive map of Neufchâtel-sur-Aisne
- Country: France
- Region: Hauts-de-France
- Department: Aisne
- No. of communes: {{{nbcomm}}}
- Disbanded: 2015
- Area: 282.96 km^{2} (109.25 sq mi)
- Population (2012): 10,209
  - Density: 36.079/km^{2} (93.445/sq mi)

The canton of Neufchâtel-sur-Aisne was an administrative division in northern France. It was disbanded following the French canton reorganisation which came into effect in March 2015. It consisted of 28 communes, which joined the new canton of Villeneuve-sur-Aisne in 2015. It had 10,209 inhabitants (2012).

The canton comprised the following communes:

- Aguilcourt
- Amifontaine
- Berry-au-Bac
- Bertricourt
- Bouffignereux
- Chaudardes
- Concevreux
- Condé-sur-Suippe
- Évergnicourt
- Gernicourt
- Guignicourt
- Guyencourt
- Juvincourt-et-Damary
- Lor
- Maizy
- La Malmaison
- Menneville
- Meurival
- Muscourt
- Neufchâtel-sur-Aisne
- Orainville
- Pignicourt
- Pontavert
- Prouvais
- Proviseux-et-Plesnoy
- Roucy
- Variscourt
- La Ville-aux-Bois-lès-Pontavert

== Demographics ==
Historical population Canton of Neufchâtel-sur-Aisne
Year	1962	1968	1975	1982	1990	1999
Pop.	6,796	7,482	7,673	7,853	8,574	9,085
±%	—	+10.1%	+2.6%	+2.3%	+9.2%	+6.0%
From the year 1962 on: No double counting – residents of multiple communes (e.g. students and military personnel) are counted only once. Source: INSEE

== See also ==
- Cantons of the Aisne department
