= Pierre Malinowski =

French historian and public figure (born 1987)

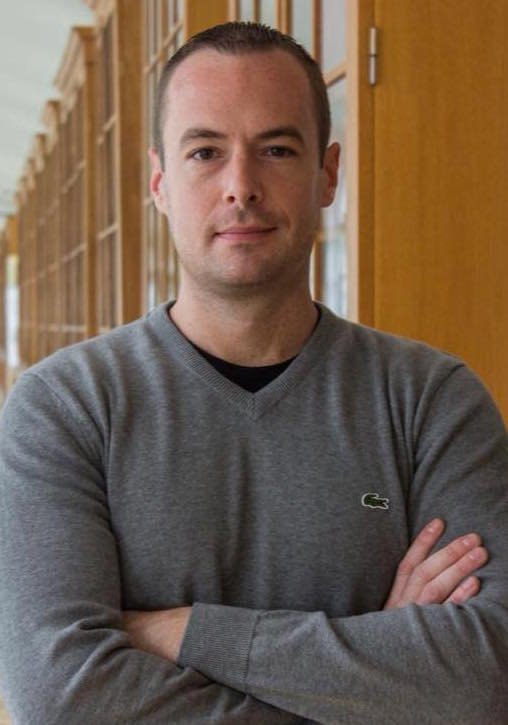
- Born: 5 August 1987 (age 37); Orainville, France
- Awards: Defense Ministry Medal "For the conservation of the memory of soldiers who died for their Motherland" (Rus); The Order of the fighter ("La Croix du Combattant") (Fr); Medal of the UN (Fr); Medal of the National Defense (Fr); Overseas Medal (Fr)

Pierre Malinowski (born 5 August 1987) is a former French Army corporal and former parliamentary assistant to the European Parliament. He is a member of the political right and is connected with the Kremlin. In October 2018, he founded the Foundation for the Development of Russian-French Historical Initiatives in Moscow, and has been the president since. His actions, and those of his foundation, have elicited controversy.

== Biography ==
Pierre Malinowski was born in Orainville, near Reims, France. His father, Alain Malinowski, was an amateur historian and is currently the mayor of Orainville. His family is of Polish origin. His grandfather was the one to first introduce him to archaeology. At the age of 18 he joined the French Foreign Legion. After serving with them for 6 months, he left to join the Armoured Cavalry Arm of the French Army. After 8 years, he left the army due to an injury.

=== Political life ===
In 2010, while writing his book, he met Jean-Marie Le Pen, who was the founder and former head of the French National Rally, which before 2018 was called the National Front. He joined the National Front and was hired as parliamentary assistant after four years. Aymeric Chauprade, who was the former adviser of Jean-Marie Le Pen's daughter Marine Le Pen, later hired Malinowski as an assistant in the European Parliament. He left the National Front in 2015. He said that he left politics, but that he maintains relationships with Le Pen and his granddaughter, Marion Maréchal. However, Libération reports that when he began to focus more on archaeology, he didn't cut his political ties with the extreme right. Le Monde also reports that he is supported by Geoffroy Lejeune, editor-in-chief of Valeurs actuelles, a French conservative political magazine.

In 2016, he travelled to Moscow with Marion Maréchal and Crimean prosecutor Natalia Poklonskaya. He also exchanges regularly with Dmitry Peskov, Kremlin spokesperson. Malinowski has lived in Moscow since 2017. According to his site, he was invited to the inauguration of Vladimir Putin in the Kremlin in May 2018, and is known to be close to the Russian President, whom he met after an archaeological dig in France.

Peskov's daughter Elizaveta Peskova is the Vice President of his foundation until March 2022.

=== The Air Cocaine affair ===
Malinowski confirmed to France 2 via telephone that he participated in the so-called "Air Cocaine Affair," according to Le Parisien. His employer, Aymeric Chauprade, was also involved. The 2013 scandal involved two former French military pilots, Pascal Fauret and Bruno Odos. They were planning to fly a Falcon 50 airplane laden with bundles of cocaine stored in luggage; the bundles that didn't fit into the 26 suitcases in the cargo hold were stuffed into the lounge of the jet. They also transported two passengers, Nicolas Pisapia and Alain Castany. All four denied knowledge of the cocaine's presence. They were arrested before their departure from the Dominican Republic on an airport tarmac. They were held for 15 months in a Dominican jail before being sentenced to 20 years in prison. Because of their lawyers' appeal, the two pilots were allowed to go on bail, but ordered to stay in the country. In a plan organised by Chapraude, Malinowski took them on a speedboat outside of the country to the French island of St. Martin. They then boarded an airplane to France, where they were arrested by French authorities. For his participation, an arrest warrant was issued for him by the authorities of the Dominican Republic, which led to an investigation into him by Interpol. He justified his role in the affair by claiming "military solidarity."

=== Involvement in the Syrian conflict ===
After the November 2015 Paris attacks, he contacted the head of the Assyrian French Legion—a group of ex-combatants—who convinced Malinowski to join them in fighting alongside Kurdish fighters in Iraq's Sinjar region. He also recruited his former fellow soldiers to capture jihadists in Syria.

== The Foundation for the Development of Russian-French Historical Initiatives ==
Malinowski is the founder and president of The Foundation for the Development of Russian-French Historical Initiatives, a foundation associated with the Russian political right. Created on 22 October 2018, it leads a number of research projects in France and in Russia.

=== The Russian Expedition in France ===
A Russian expeditionary force was sent to France during World War I, who ended up participating in the wave of mutinies sweeping across France. Starting in 2013, Malinowski organised an archaeological dig in Cormicy, France to explore for the remains of these soldiers. On 24 December 2016, he found the remains of a soldier. This was the first time that the remains of a Russian soldier had been found on French soil since the end of the war. The body was buried at a cemetery in Saint-Hilaire-le-Grand in a ceremony involving Alexandre Orlov, the Russian ambassador to France. It was after this find that Putin asked to meet Malinowski. During a second dig in August 2017, Malinowski found the remains of another Russian soldier.

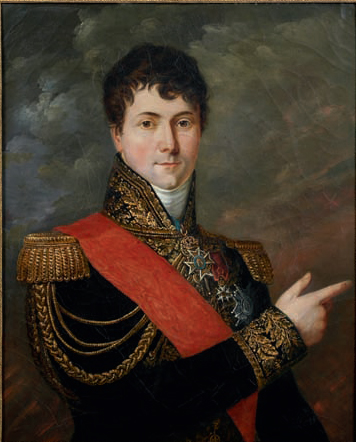
General Charles Étienne Gudin (1768-1812), whose remains were unearthed during excavations carried out by Pierre Malinowski's teams.

=== The Russian Campaign ===
In May 2019, the Foundation for the Development of Russian-French Historical Initiatives organized a major historical project between France and Russia. An archeological expedition took place in the Smolensk oblast of the Russian Federation. The team of researchers was led by Malinowski and made up of different specialists, including topographers, historians, and French and Russian students. The main excavation took place in the area where the Battle of Valutino took place, where more than 12,000 soldiers died. The expedition found many artifacts, as well as the remains of soldiers and horses.

On 10 July 2019, the remains of General Charles-Étienne Gudin de la Sablonnière, a French general close with Napoleon, were found in the city of Smolensk, Russia. The results of a DNA analysis confirmed that the body belonged to the general. Originally, Malinowski had planned for a larger ceremony involving Presidents Vladimir Putin and Emmanuel Macron at the complex of Les Invalides in Paris; he had even obtained permission from Macron's administration to hold the ceremony. However, the coronavirus pandemic and the poisoning of Alexei Navalny made the French government dismiss the plan.

His return and burial in France gave rise to a controversy; the French government refused to repatriate General Gudin, so Malinowski decided to independently organize return of the remains of the general from Moscow to Paris on 13 July 2021 via an Airbus A320 aircraft, donated by Russian oligarch Andry Kozystin. French Secretary of State to the Minister of the Armed Forces, Geneviève Darrieussecq, eventually received the body in a ceremony at Paris–Le Bourget Airport.

=== Vyazma Project ===
In September 2019, 126 bodies of soldiers from the Grand Army and of the Tsar were exhumed; this included three first-aid women and three children drummers. They had been killed during the bloody retreat of Russia in November 1812 during the Battle of Vyazma. After exhumation, the bodies were interred with military honors on 13 February 2021. The remains were buried with military honors in Vyazma near the Saint-Catherine cemetery.

=== The Crimean War ===
From the 1–20 October 2020, excavations undertaken in Crimea and at Sevastopol found dozens of soldier's bodies. There were French soldiers killed during the Battle of Inkerman; English soldiers killed during the Siege of Sevastopol; and Russian soldiers killed during the Battle of the Alma. The actions of Malinowski aroused controversy. Russia and the government of Sevastopol have authorized Pierre Malinowski to organize the funerals of more than 150 French soldiers, found in 2013 in Sevastopol during construction work. They are now buried in the cemetery of Sevastopol, along with 20,000 other French soldiers.

=== Stalingrad Project ===
On 19–30 April 2021, a project is organized in Volgograd on the theme of the battle of Stalingrad, with the presence of veterans from Russia, France and USA.

=== Leningrad Project ===
On 29 October 2021, the foundation organizes a meeting of Russian, French and American veterans in Saint-Petersburg at the Piskaryovskoye Memorial Cemetery, to commemorate the defense of the Siege of Leningrad.

=== Courcy Project ===
In September 2023, Pierre Malinowski finds the remains of 6 soldiers from the Russian Expeditionary Force in France, killed on 16 April 1917 in Courcy. The soldiers are buried on 27 October 2023 in the Russian cemetery of Saint-Hilaire-le-Grand in the Marne department.

=== The Winterberg Tunnel ===
On 4–5 May 1917 in Craonne (Chemin des Dames), more than 275 young German soldiers of the R.I.R 111 from Wurtenberg disappeared in a tunnel. The nearly 300-meter-long tunnel was used to supply the front line with men, arms and ammunition. The French artillery managed to destroy the two entrances and the 275 soldiers remained stranded more than 20 meters underground. Only three were saved a week later. After more than 20 years of research by his father, Alain Malinowski, he decided to illegally dig it up in January 2020, forcing the hand of the French and German governments.

== Bibliography ==
He wrote À la recherche du tombeau perdu.
