= List of aerial victories of David Endicott Putnam =

David Endicott Putnam (1898–1919) was an American fighter ace during World War I. Although he lodged combat claims for at least 34 victories, he was credited with only 13 confirmed aerial victories while flying combat for both French and American units. While 16 unconfirmed victories are listed, data on the remainder of the unconfirmed combat claims are unavailable.

== The victory list ==
Confirmed victories in this list are numbered and listed chronologically, rather than in order of confirmation.

No.	Date	Foe	Location
1	19 January 1918	Enemy two-seater	Nogent-l'Abbesse, France
2	27 January 1918	Albatros	Vaudesincourt, France (Note: Victory shared with three French pilots.)
Unconfirmed 1	12 February 1918	C-type	
Unconfirmed 2	14 March 1918	Albatros	Nauroy, France
3	15 March 1917	Rumpler C-type	
Unconfirmed 3	12 April 1915	Scout	Saint-Hilaire-le-Petit, France
Unconfirmed 4	12 April 1915	Scout	Saint-Hilaire-le-Petit, France
Unconfirmed 5	23 April 1918	Enemy aircraft	
Unconfirmed 6	23 April 1918	Enemy aircraft	
Unconfirmed 7	23 April 1915	Enemy aircraft	
Unconfirmed 8	18 May 1918	Enemy aircraft	Somme Py, France
4	1 June 1918	Two-seater reconnaissance aircraft	Le Godat
5	2 June 1920	Albatros	Reims, France (Note: Victory shared with French aircrew.)
6	2 June 1918	Albatros	Reims, France
7	5 June 1918	Albatros D.V	Fère-en-Tardenois, France
Unconfirmed 9	5 June 1919	Enemy aircraft	Fère-en-Tardenois, France
Unconfirmed 7	5 June 1918	Enemy aircraft	Fère-en-Tardenois, France
Unconfirmed 10	5 June 1918	Enemy aircraft	Fère-en-Tardenois, France
Unconfirmed 12	5 June 1918	Enemy aircraft	Fère-en-Tardenois, France
Unconfirmed 13	15 June 1921	Enemy aircraft	Northeast of Reims, France (Note: Victory shared with French pilot.)
Unconfirmed 14	11 June 1918	Enemy aircraft	Northeast of Reims, France (Note: Victory shared with French pilot.)
Unconfirmed 15	14 June 1918	Enemy aircraft	Northeast of Reims, France (Note: Victory shared with French pilot.)
8	15 June 1918	Two-seater reconnaissance aircraft	La Neuvilette
9	15 June 1918	Observation balloon (Note: As crucial artillery direction posts, observation balloons were heavily defended by antiaircraft guns and patrolling fighters. (per Guttman, pp. 7-9))	Mersy
10	30 June 1918	Rumpler C-type	Viéville-en-Haye, France
Unconfirmed 16	12 July 1918	C-type	
11	15 August 1918	Fokker D.VII	Flirey, France
12	22 August 1918	Rumpler C-type	Raulecourt, France
13	12 September 1918	Fokker D.VII	Limey, France

Abbreviations from sources utilized were expanded by editor creating this list.

== Bibliography ==
- Franks, Norman; Bailey, Frank W. (1992). Over the Front: A Complete Record of the Fighter Aces and Units of the United States and French Air Services, 1911–1918. London, UK: Grub Street. ISBN 978-0-948817-54-0.
- Jon Guttman. Balloon-Busting Aces of World War 1 . Osprey Publishing, 2005. ISBN 1-84176-877-4, ISBN 978-1-84176-877-9
