= Moronvilliers =

Former commune in France

- Former commune
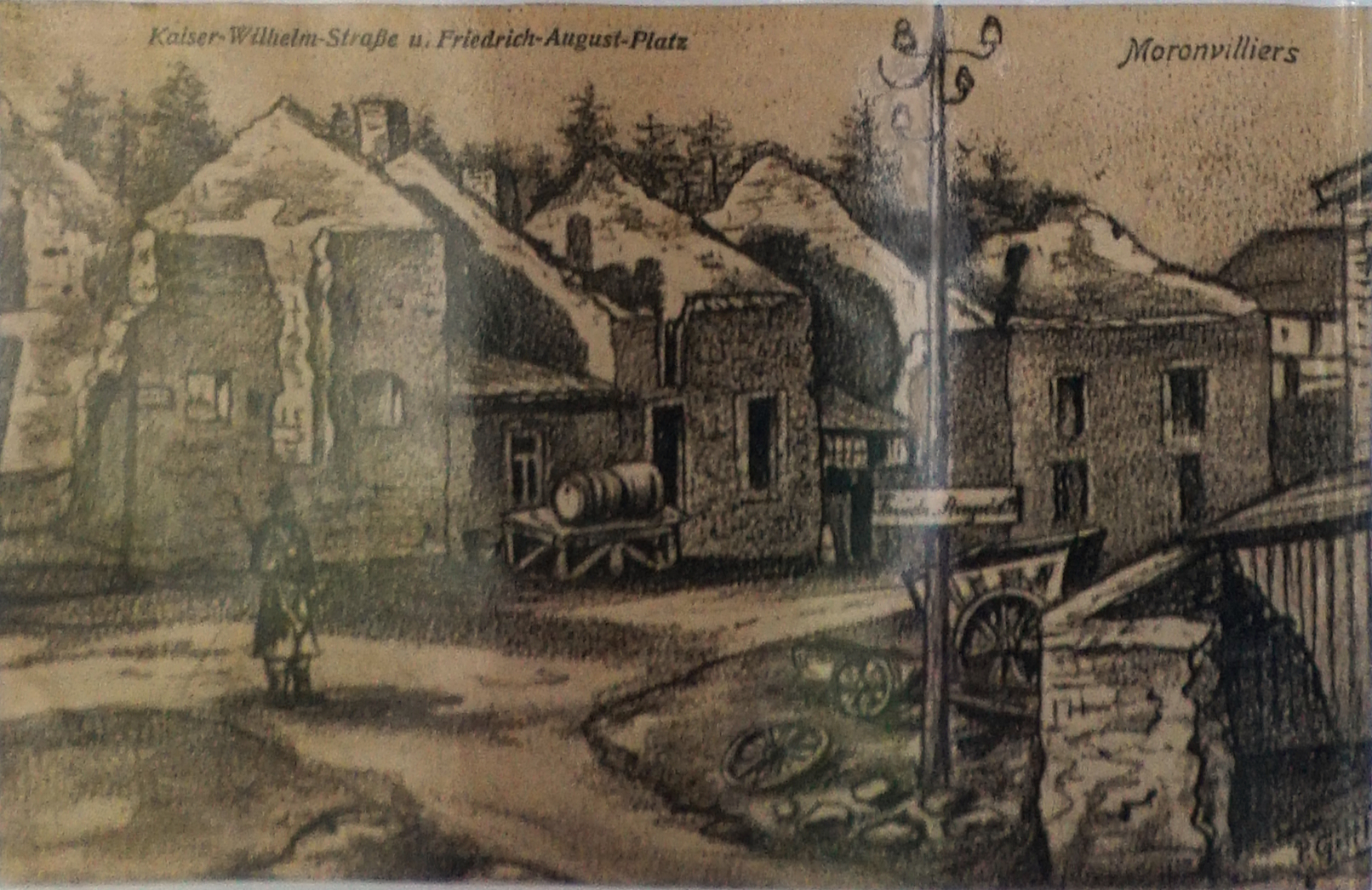
- Location of Moronvilliers
- Location within France Location within Grand Est
- Coordinates: 49°14′28″N 4°19′47″E
- Country: France
- Region: Grand Est
- Department: Marne
- Arrondissement: Reims
- Population (1946): 0
- Time zone: UTC+01:00 (CET)
  - Summer (DST): UTC+02:00 (CEST)
- INSEE/Postal code: 51385 /51490

Moronvilliers was a commune located in the department of Marne. It was eliminated in 1942. In 1911, it had 86 inhabitants.

On 2 September 1914, in the first month of World War I, the village, only 15 kilometers north-east from Rheims, was occupied by German troops. Situated on the frontline, the village was deserted and destroyed during the war.

The village was never rebuilt after the war. On June 17, 1950, part of its territory was merged with that of Pontfaverger, which changed its name to Pontfaverger-Moronvilliers. Other parts were added to Saint-Hilaire-le-Petit and Saint-Martin-l'Heureux.

The Camp de Moronvilliers has been the site of simulated nuclear testing or "cold firings" in the past, which caused many issues with both the general public and foreign observers.
