= Winterberg tunnel =

Passageway near Craonne, France

Coordinates: 49.451570034°N 3.781652°E

The Winterberg tunnel was built by the Imperial German Army through a ridge near Craonne, France during World War I. The 300 m (980 ft) underground passageway, which connected the German frontline to its rear echelon areas, was used to mitigate French artillery on this part of the line when moving troops and equipment into trenches. It was built at a depth of more than 20 m (66 ft).

In 1917, more than 250 German soldiers were buried alive when the French launched a targeted barrage at both ends of the Winterberg tunnel. Only three men survived. No rescue attempt was launched due to continuing shelling of the area and a subsequent French counterattack. The tunnel was largely forgotten until a family of amateur historians announced they had found one of the tunnel's entrances in 2020.

== History ==
On 4 and 5 May 1917, the French military used an observation balloon to precisely identify the coordinates to the southern and northern portals to the tunnel. Using this information, a very accurate barrage destroyed the tunnel's entrances on both flanks of the ridge. The attack also managed to detonate munitions stored at the tunnel openings further sealing the entrances. The destruction left hundreds of German soldiers from the Baden Reserve Infantry Regiment 111 buried deep within the ridge near Craonne. The 300 m (980 ft) tunnel, which was used to supply the first front line with men and materiel, was sealed when French artillery succeeded in destroying the two entrances trapping the troops more than 20 m (66 ft) underground. After being sealed in, only three men were able to get out, they said they witnessed the trapped men slowly suffocating, dying of thirst or taking their own lives. Only two were saved a week later.

== Discovery ==
This tunnel was discovered in January 2020 by a family of amateur historians. Alain Malinowski, mayor of Orainville, worked with the archives for 25 years to find the entrance, while his son Pierre Malinowski organised the night operation to open the tunnel with a crane. In 2021, French and German organisations opened up the tunnel to give a proper burial to the soldiers who had died years before. In 2023, it was decided that the peace in death shall not be disturbed by further attempts to relocate the remains, and the site was declared a war memorial.
