= Selles, Marne =

Selles
- Commune
- Location of Selles
- Location within France Location within Grand Est
- Coordinates: 49°18′25″N 4°17′12″E
- Country: France
- Region: Grand Est
- Department: Marne
- Arrondissement: Reims
- Canton: Mourmelon-Vesle et Monts de Champagne
- Intercommunality: CU Grand Reims

Government
  - Mayor (2020–2026): Jean Letissier
- Area^{1}: 11.34 km^{2} (4.38 sq mi)
- Elevation: 92 m (302 ft)
- Population (2023): 464
  - Density: 40.9/km^{2} (106/sq mi)
- Time zone: UTC+01:00 (CET)
  - Summer (DST): UTC+02:00 (CEST)
- INSEE/Postal code: 51529 /51490
- ^{1} French Land Register data, which excludes lakes, ponds, glaciers > 1 km^{2} (0.386 sq mi or 247 acres) and river estuaries.

Selles (French pronunciation: [sɛl]) is a commune in the Marne department in north-eastern France.

== Geography ==
The commune is traversed by the Suippe river.

== See also ==
- Communes of the Marne department
