= Boult-sur-Suippe =

- Commune
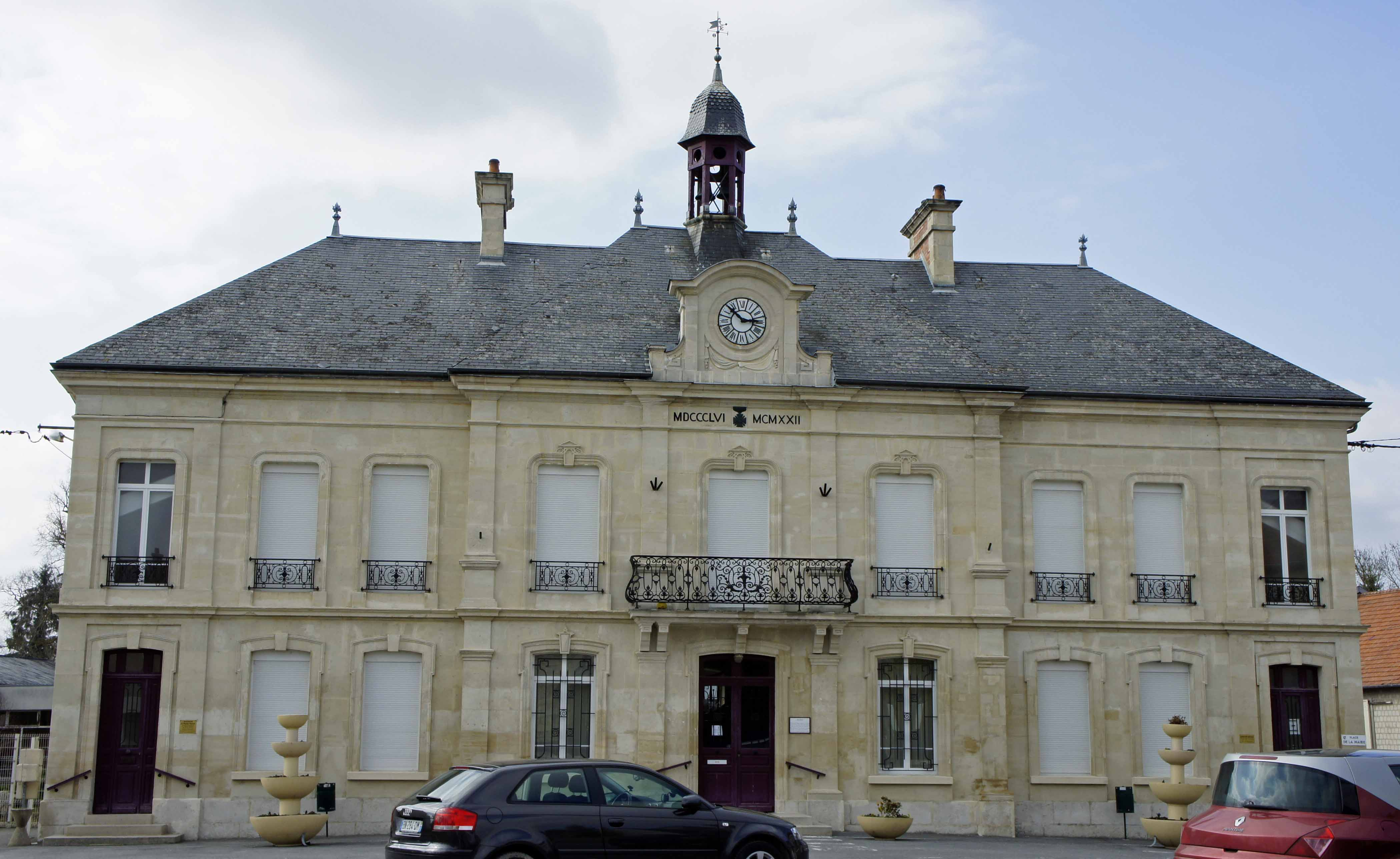
- The town hall in Boult-sur-Suippe

- Coat of arms
- Location of Boult-sur-Suippe
- Location within France Location within Grand Est
- Coordinates: 49°22′17″N 4°08′47″E
- Country: France
- Region: Grand Est
- Department: Marne
- Arrondissement: Reims
- Canton: Bourgogne-Fresne
- Intercommunality: CU Grand Reims

Government
  - Mayor (2020–2026): Christian Thiebeaux
- Area^{1}: 19.75 km^{2} (7.63 sq mi)
- Elevation: 98 m (322 ft)
- Population (2023): 1,793
  - Density: 90.78/km^{2} (235.1/sq mi)
- Time zone: UTC+01:00 (CET)
  - Summer (DST): UTC+02:00 (CEST)
- INSEE/Postal code: 51074 /51110
- ^{1} French Land Register data, which excludes lakes, ponds, glaciers > 1 km^{2} (0.386 sq mi or 247 acres) and river estuaries.

Boult-sur-Suippe (French pronunciation: [bul(t) syʁ sɥip], literally Boult on Suippe) is a commune of the Marne department in northeastern France.

== Geography ==
The commune is traversed by the Suippe river.

== Population ==
Historical population
| Year | Pop. | ±% p.a. |
|---|---|---|
| 1968 | 974 | — |
| 1975 | 938 | −0.54% |
| 1982 | 899 | −0.60% |
| 1990 | 1,361 | +5.32% |
| 1999 | 1,353 | −0.07% |
| 2007 | 1,463 | +0.98% |
| 2012 | 1,688 | +2.90% |
| 2017 | 1,705 | +0.20% |
| 2023 | 1,793 | +0.84% |
Source: INSEE

== History ==
Boult-sur-Suippe is about 64 kilometers (40 mi) from the Belgium border, and during World War I the village was positioned along the Western Front (World War I), and the German troops established a hospital in the village. A cemetery in the village was used by the Germans between October 1914 and October 1918, and was perhaps directly linked to the battles of Reims, also called the Second Battle of the Marne and surrounding forts. Recent archaeological investigations have discovered over 500 graves in the cemetery, some of them identified as German and English troops, a few who were listed as Missing in action.

== See also ==
- Communes of the Marne department
