= Somme-Suippe =

- Commune
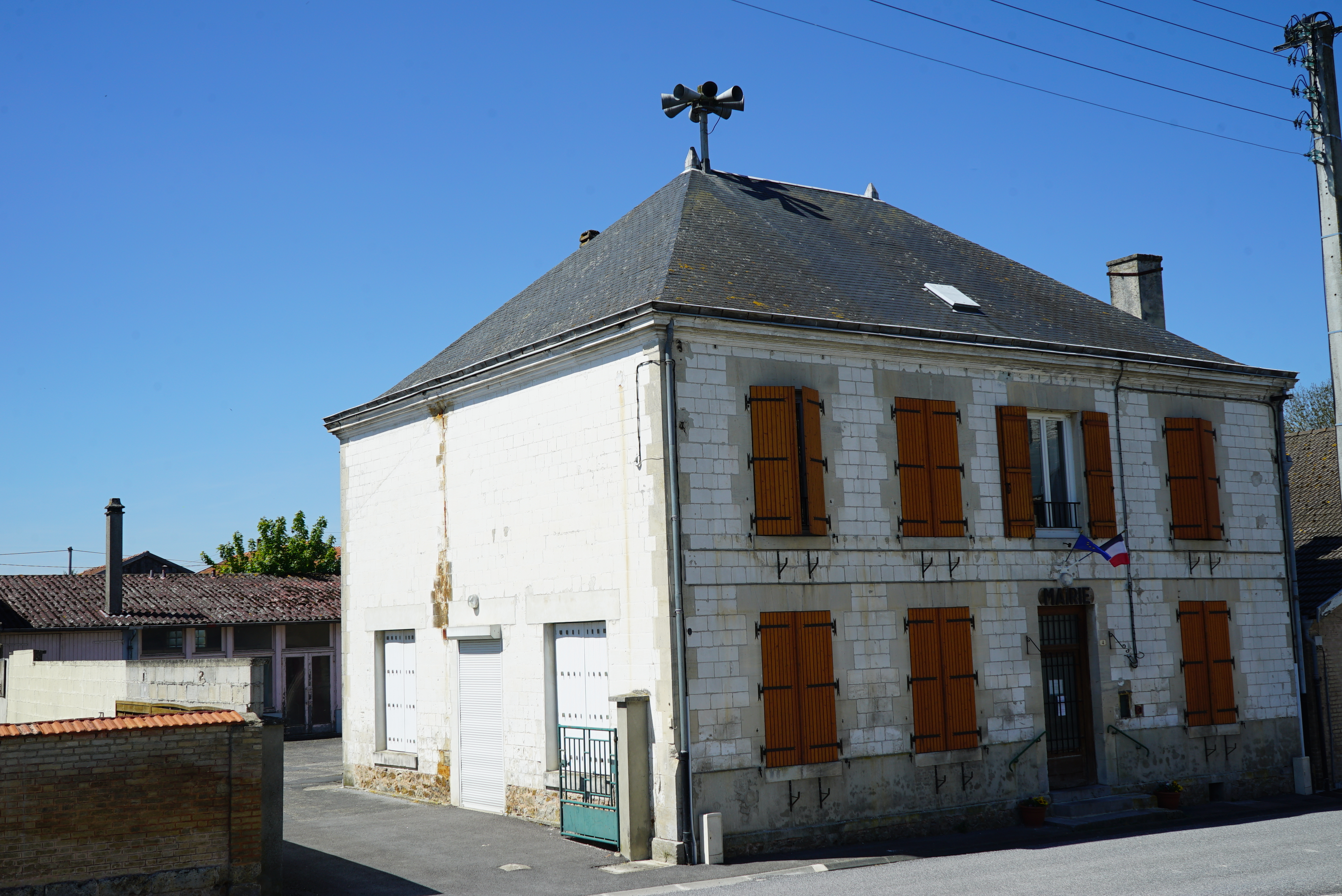
- The town hall in Somme-Suippe
- Location of Somme-Suippe
- Location within France Location within Grand Est
- Coordinates: 49°06′59″N 4°34′53″E
- Country: France
- Region: Grand Est
- Department: Marne
- Arrondissement: Châlons-en-Champagne
- Canton: Argonne Suippe et Vesle
- Intercommunality: Région de Suippes

Government
  - Mayor (2020–2026): Francis Colmart
- Area^{1}: 31.51 km^{2} (12.17 sq mi)
- Elevation: 146 m (479 ft)
- Population (2023): 513
  - Density: 16.3/km^{2} (42.2/sq mi)
- Time zone: UTC+01:00 (CET)
  - Summer (DST): UTC+02:00 (CEST)
- INSEE/Postal code: 51546 /51600
- ^{1} French Land Register data, which excludes lakes, ponds, glaciers > 1 km^{2} (0.386 sq mi or 247 acres) and river estuaries.

Somme-Suippe (French pronunciation: [sɔm sɥip]) is a commune in the Marne department in north-eastern France.

== Geography ==
The Suippe river has its source in the commune.

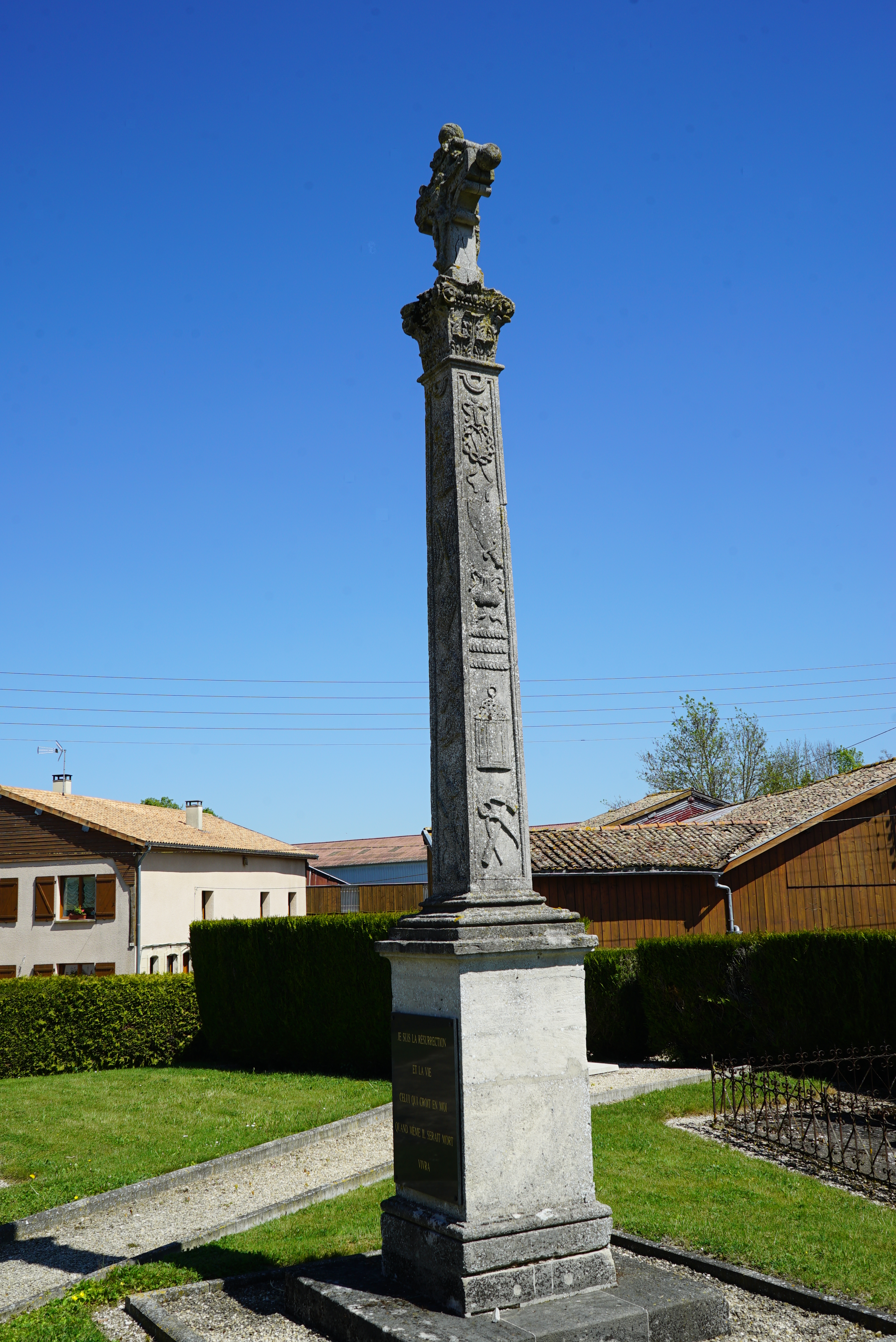

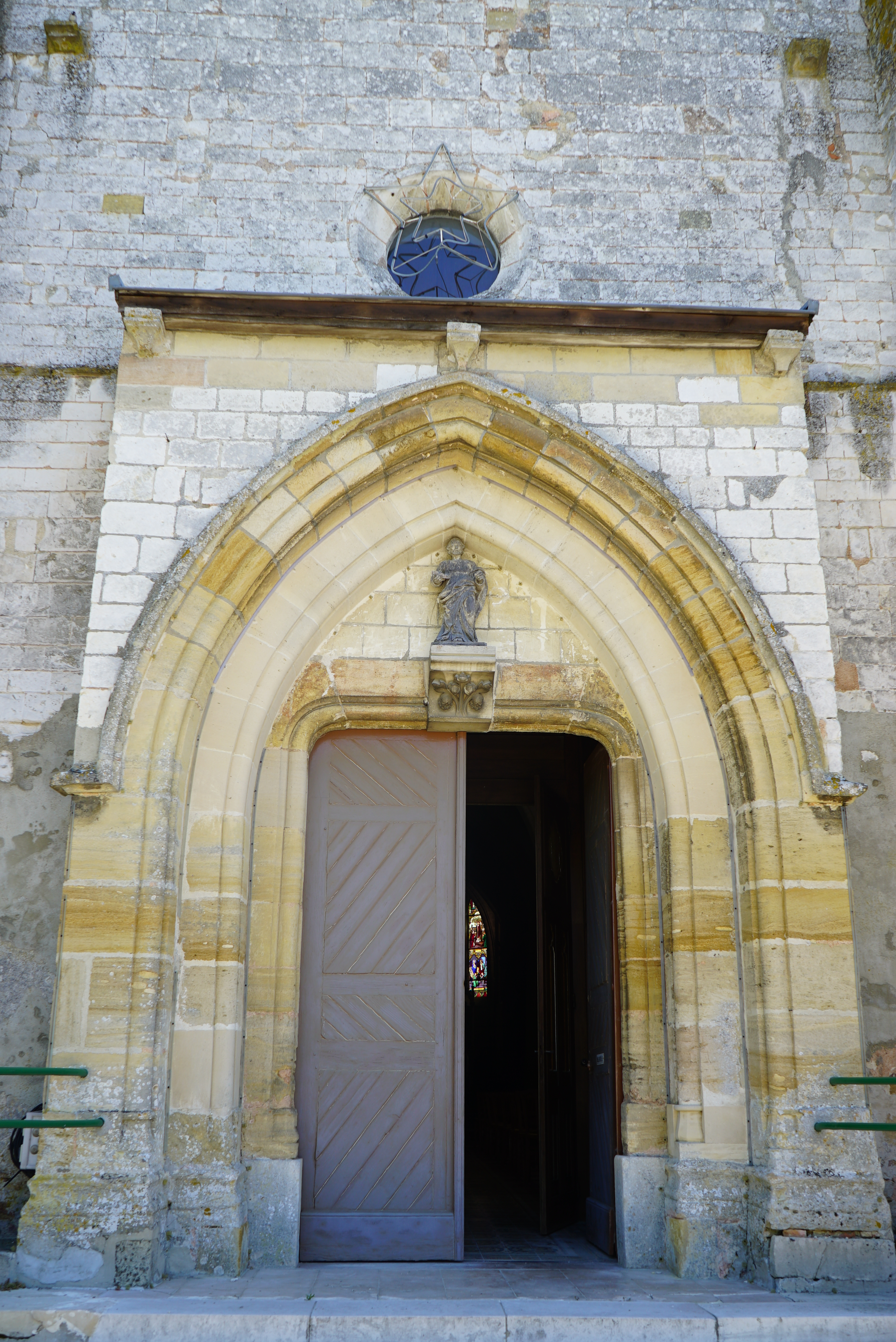

== See also ==
- Communes of the Marne department
