= Saint-Étienne-sur-Suippe =

- Commune
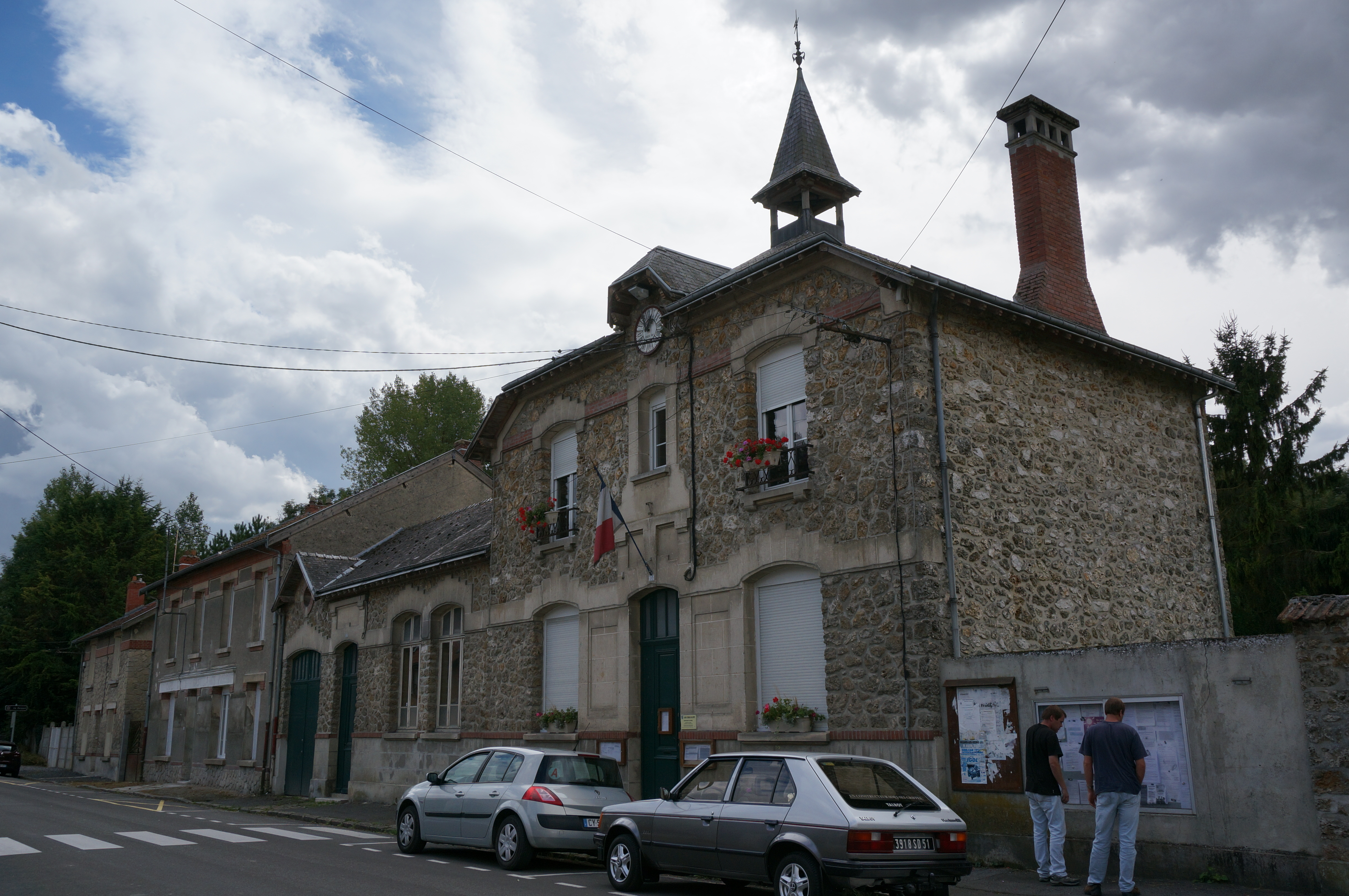
- The town hall in Saint-Étienne-sur-Suippe

- Coat of arms
- Location of Saint-Étienne-sur-Suippe
- Location within France Location within Grand Est
- Coordinates: 49°23′14″N 4°05′49″E
- Country: France
- Region: Grand Est
- Department: Marne
- Arrondissement: Reims
- Canton: Bourgogne-Fresne
- Intercommunality: CU Grand Reims

Government
  - Mayor (2020–2026): Christophe Madelain
- Area^{1}: 7.74 km^{2} (2.99 sq mi)
- Elevation: 71 m (233 ft)
- Population (2023): 356
  - Density: 46.0/km^{2} (119/sq mi)
- Time zone: UTC+01:00 (CET)
  - Summer (DST): UTC+02:00 (CEST)
- INSEE/Postal code: 51477 /51110
- ^{1} French Land Register data, which excludes lakes, ponds, glaciers > 1 km^{2} (0.386 sq mi or 247 acres) and river estuaries.

Saint-Étienne-sur-Suippe (French pronunciation: [sɛ̃.t‿etjɛn syʁ sɥip], literally Saint-Étienne on Suippe) is a commune in the Marne department in north-eastern France.

== Geography ==
The Suippe forms part of the commune's eastern border, flows westward through the middle of the commune, then forms part of its western border.

== See also ==
- Communes of the Marne department
