= Isles-sur-Suippe =

- Commune
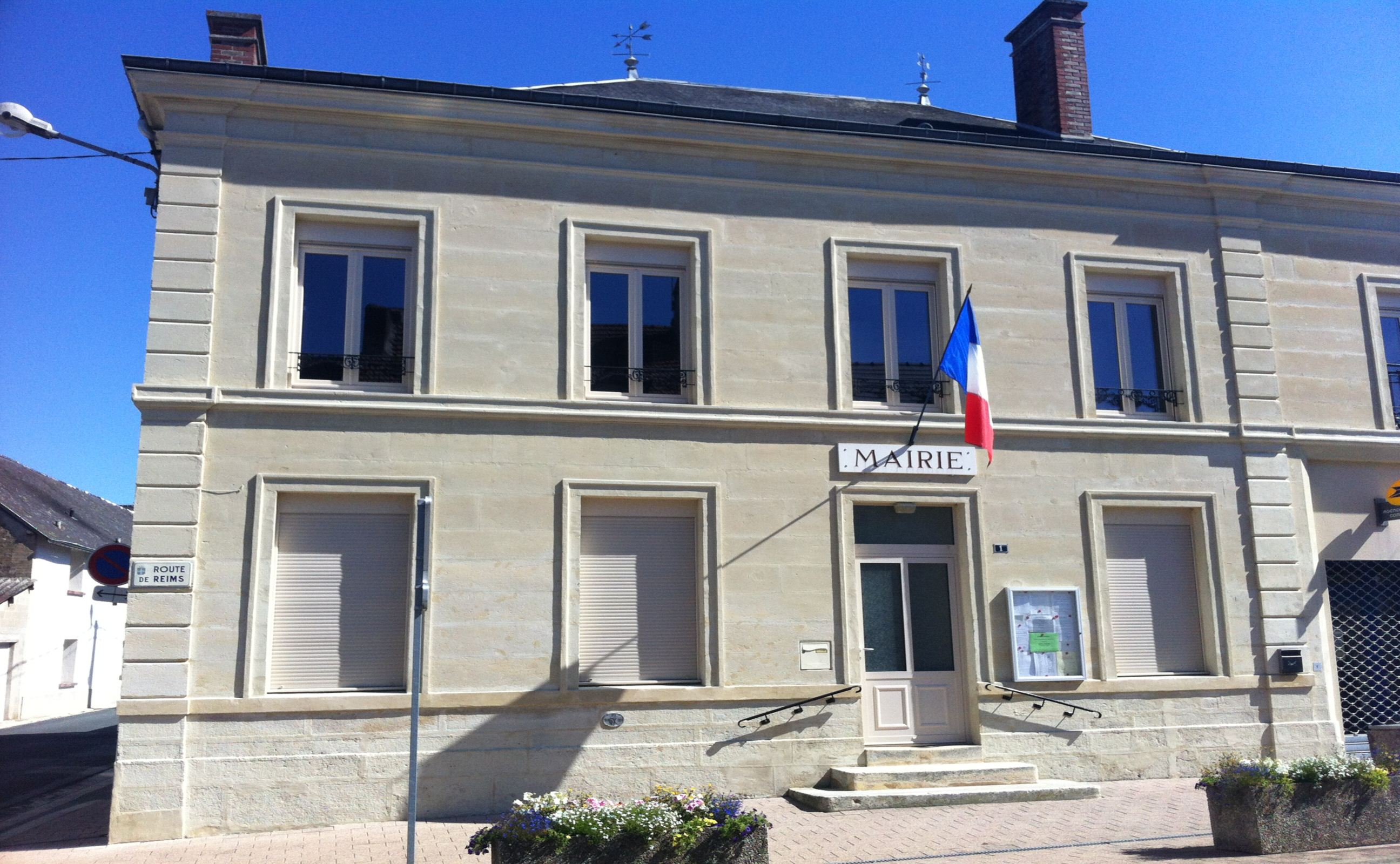
- The town hall in Isles-sur-Suippe

- Coat of arms
- Location of Isles-sur-Suippe
- Location within France Location within Grand Est
- Coordinates: 49°21′26″N 4°12′05″E
- Country: France
- Region: Grand Est
- Department: Marne
- Arrondissement: Reims
- Canton: Bourgogne-Fresne
- Intercommunality: CU Grand Reims

Government
  - Mayor (2020–2026): Guy Riffe
- Area^{1}: 12.39 km^{2} (4.78 sq mi)
- Elevation: 78 m (256 ft)
- Population (2023): 975
  - Density: 78.7/km^{2} (204/sq mi)
- Time zone: UTC+01:00 (CET)
  - Summer (DST): UTC+02:00 (CEST)
- INSEE/Postal code: 51299 /51110
- ^{1} French Land Register data, which excludes lakes, ponds, glaciers > 1 km^{2} (0.386 sq mi or 247 acres) and river estuaries.

Isles-sur-Suippe (French pronunciation: [il syʁ sɥip], lit. 'Isles on Suippe') is a commune in the Marne department in north-eastern France.

== Geography ==
The commune is traversed by the Suippe river.

== History ==
Isles-sur-Suippe, Insula super Suppia at the early 11th century, is a village located between two branches of the Suippe, on the road from Reims to Rethel.

=== The relay station ===
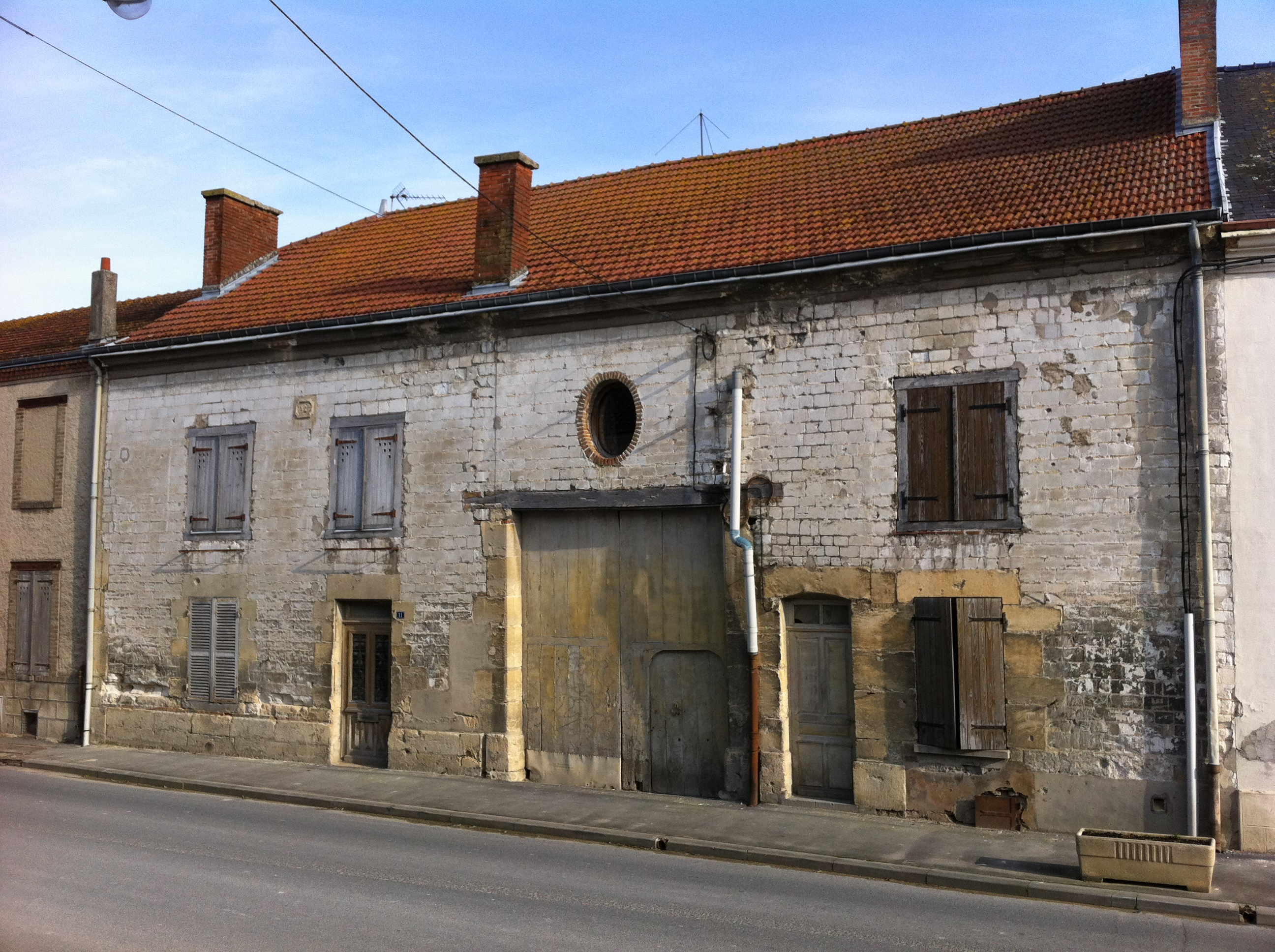
L'ancien relais de poste

The royal relay station of Ysle was founded mid-17th century, the postal road from Paris to Sedan, started in 1654, had a mandatory halt there; located between the halts of Reims and Rethel-Mazarin, it was an important link of the road to Sedan, a then predominant town of the Ardennes. At that time, the Galand family settled in Ysle and initiated a postmaster dynasty.

=== Late modern and contemporary ===
During his 18th official trip, General Charles de Gaulle, president of the Republic of France, halts in Isles-sur-Suippe on 22 April 1963. He was welcomed by préfet Jean-Émile Vié, by mayor Charles Dolhem, by gendarmes, by the fire department and the entire population. He was offered a bunch of flowers by a schoolgirl.

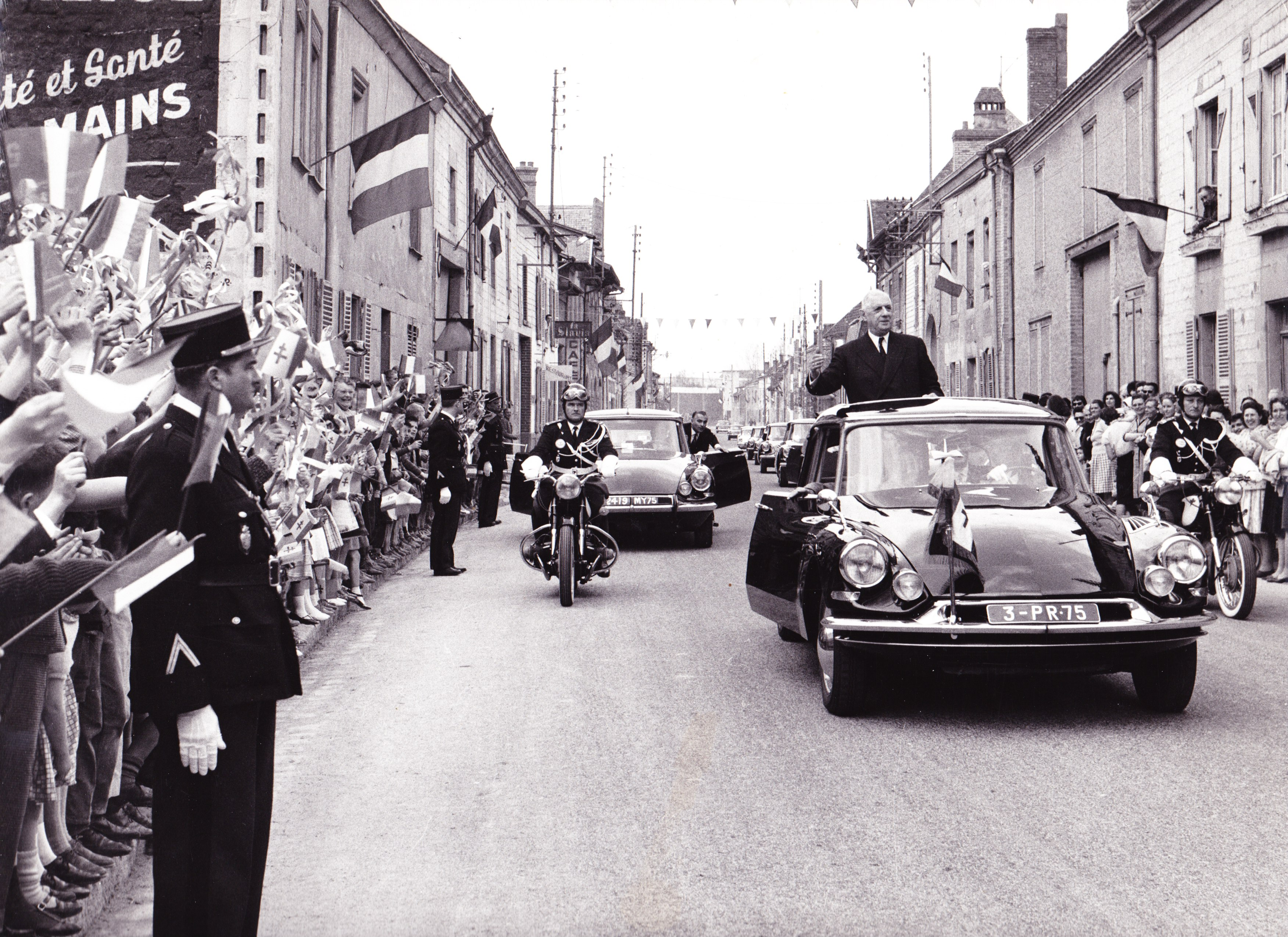
Le président de la République salue la foule à son arrivée à Isles-sur-Suippe

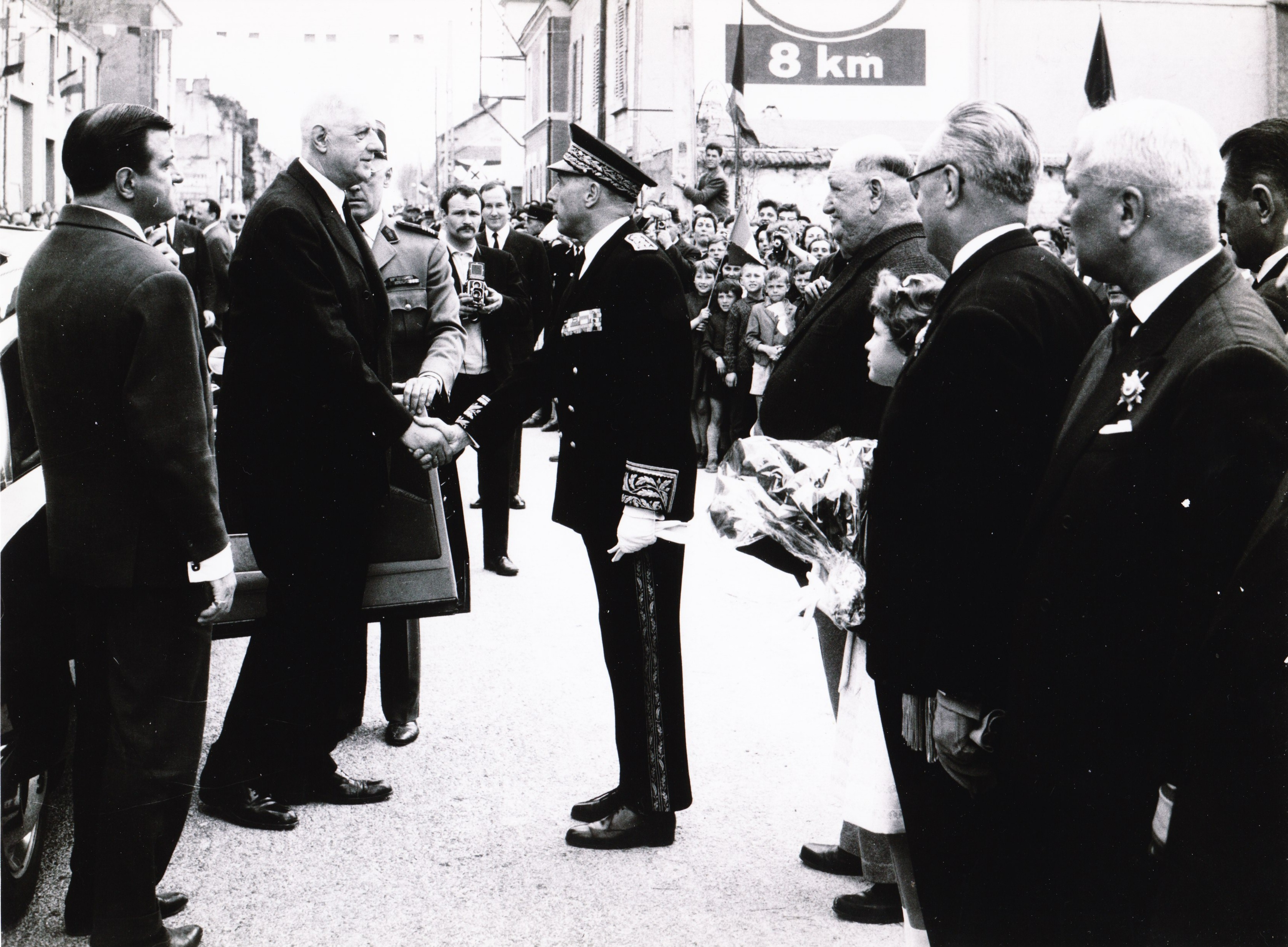
Le président de la République salue le préfet sous le regard du maire Monsieur Dolhem

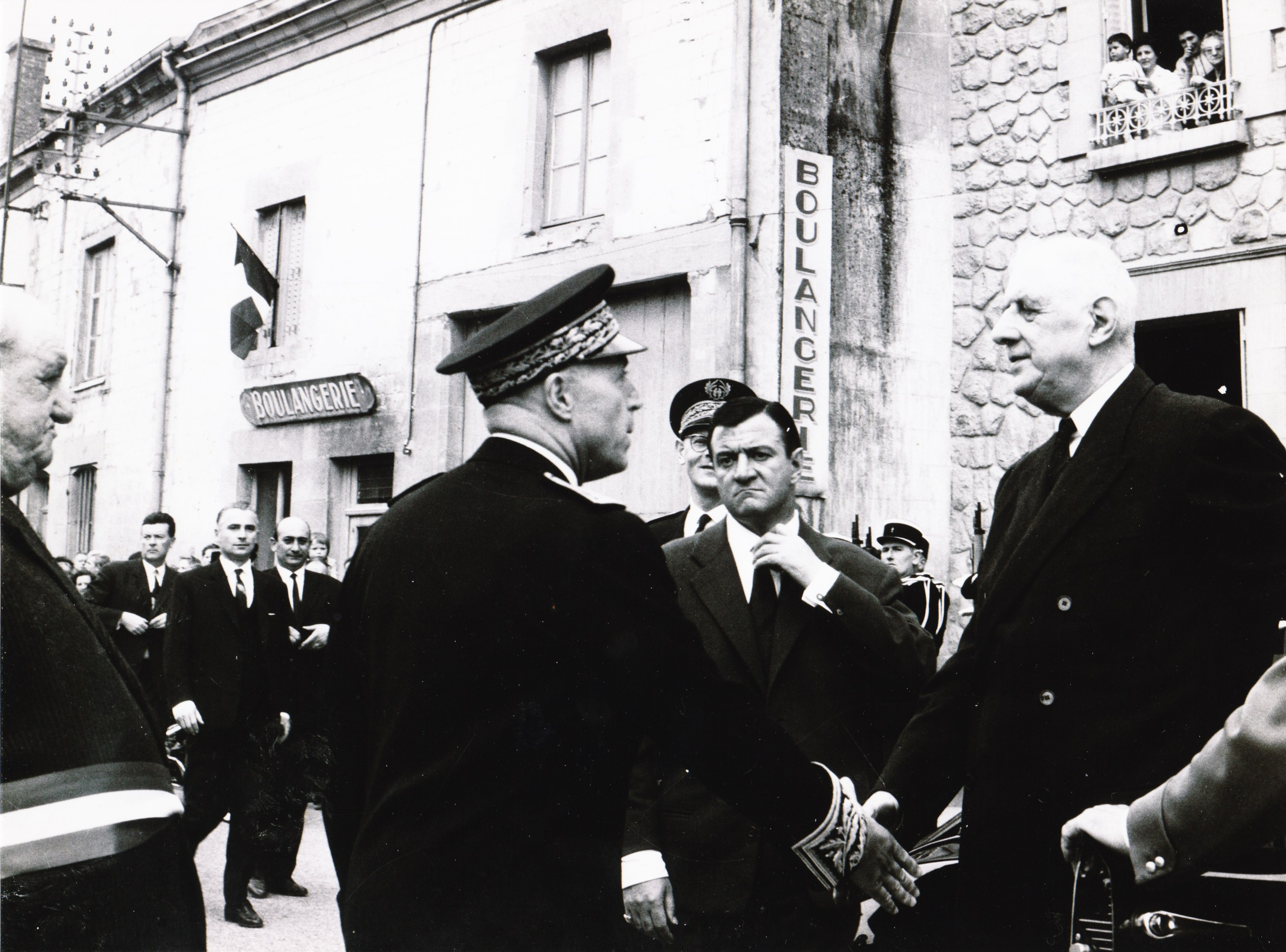
Le président de la République salue le préfet Monsieur Vie

== See also ==
- Communes of the Marne department
