= Aguilcourt =

- Commune
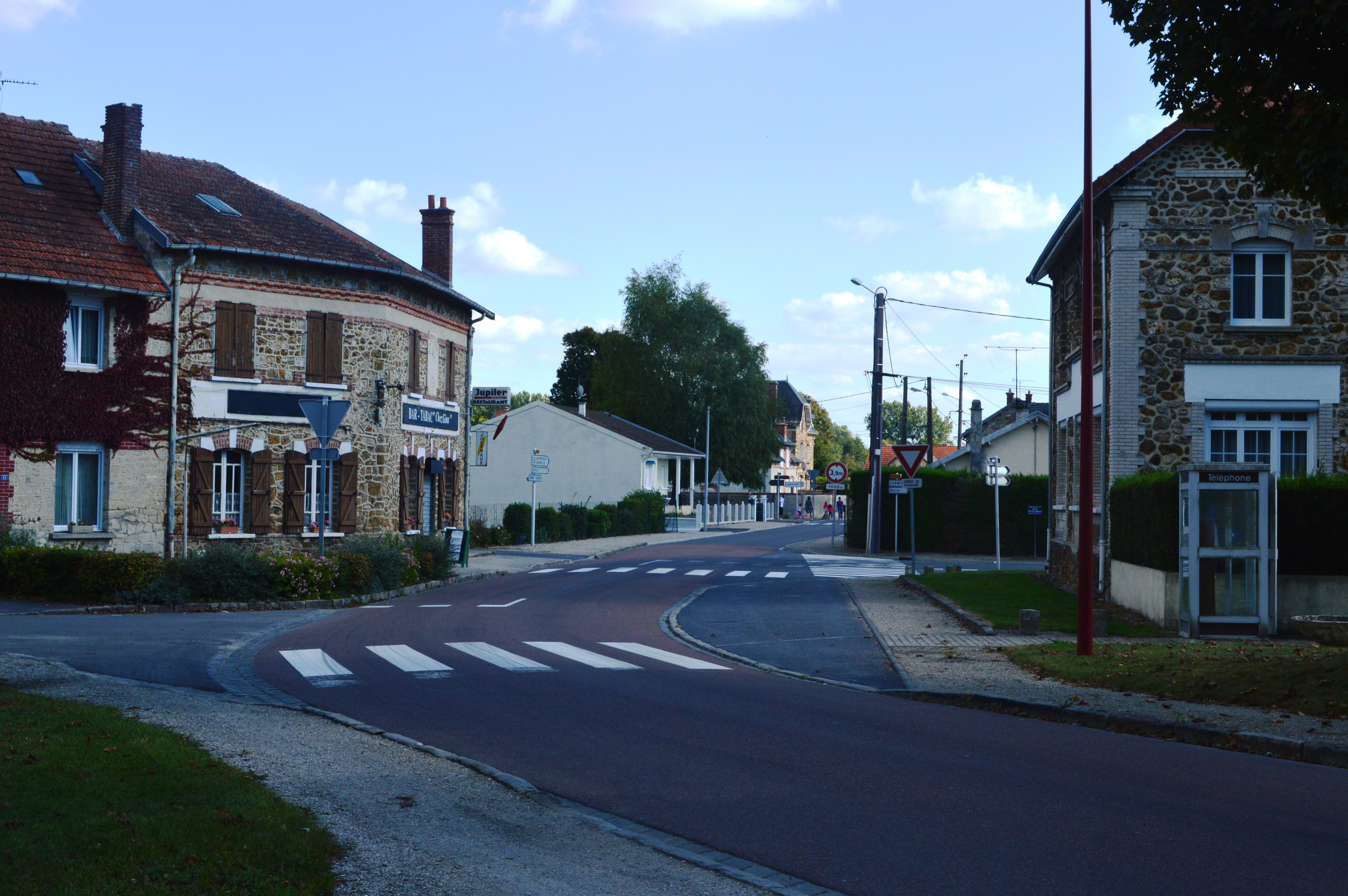

- Coat of arms
- Location of Aguilcourt
- Location within France Location within Hauts-de-France
- Coordinates: 49°24′24″N 3°58′08″E
- Country: France
- Region: Hauts-de-France
- Department: Aisne
- Arrondissement: Laon
- Canton: Villeneuve-sur-Aisne
- Intercommunality: Champagne Picarde

Government
  - Mayor (2026–32): Paul Mougenot
- Area^{1}: 10.57 km^{2} (4.08 sq mi)
- Elevation: 35 m (115 ft)
- Highest elevation: 102 m (335 ft)
- Lowest elevation: 54 m (177 ft)
- Population (2023): 417
  - Density: 39.5/km^{2} (102/sq mi)
- Time zone: UTC+01:00 (CET)
  - Summer (DST): UTC+02:00 (CEST)
- INSEE/Postal code: 02005 /02190
- ^{1} French Land Register data, which excludes lakes, ponds, glaciers > 1 km^{2} (0.386 sq mi or 247 acres) and river estuaries.

Aguilcourt (French pronunciation: [aɡilkuʁ]) is a commune in the department of Aisne in the Hauts-de-France region of northern France.

== Geography ==
Aguilcourt is 2 km south of the town of Guignicourt. From Guignicourt the commune can be reached by road D62 which runs from the north-west border of the commune through the village and continues to Orainville in the south-east. Highway D622 runs south-west from the village to Cormicy. The western edge of the commune is traversed by the A26 autoroute (E17) but the nearest exit is Exit 14 north of the commune and west of Guignicourt. Some 200m north-east of the town is the Grand Marais railway station just outside the border of the commune. From here trains run north to Guignicourt and south to Loivre.

The Suippe river forms most of the commune's northeastern border.

== Heraldry ==
| Arms of Aguilcourt | Blazon: Parti per pale, one gules a cross bottony of Argent and two of Or a lion of Azure. |

== Administration ==
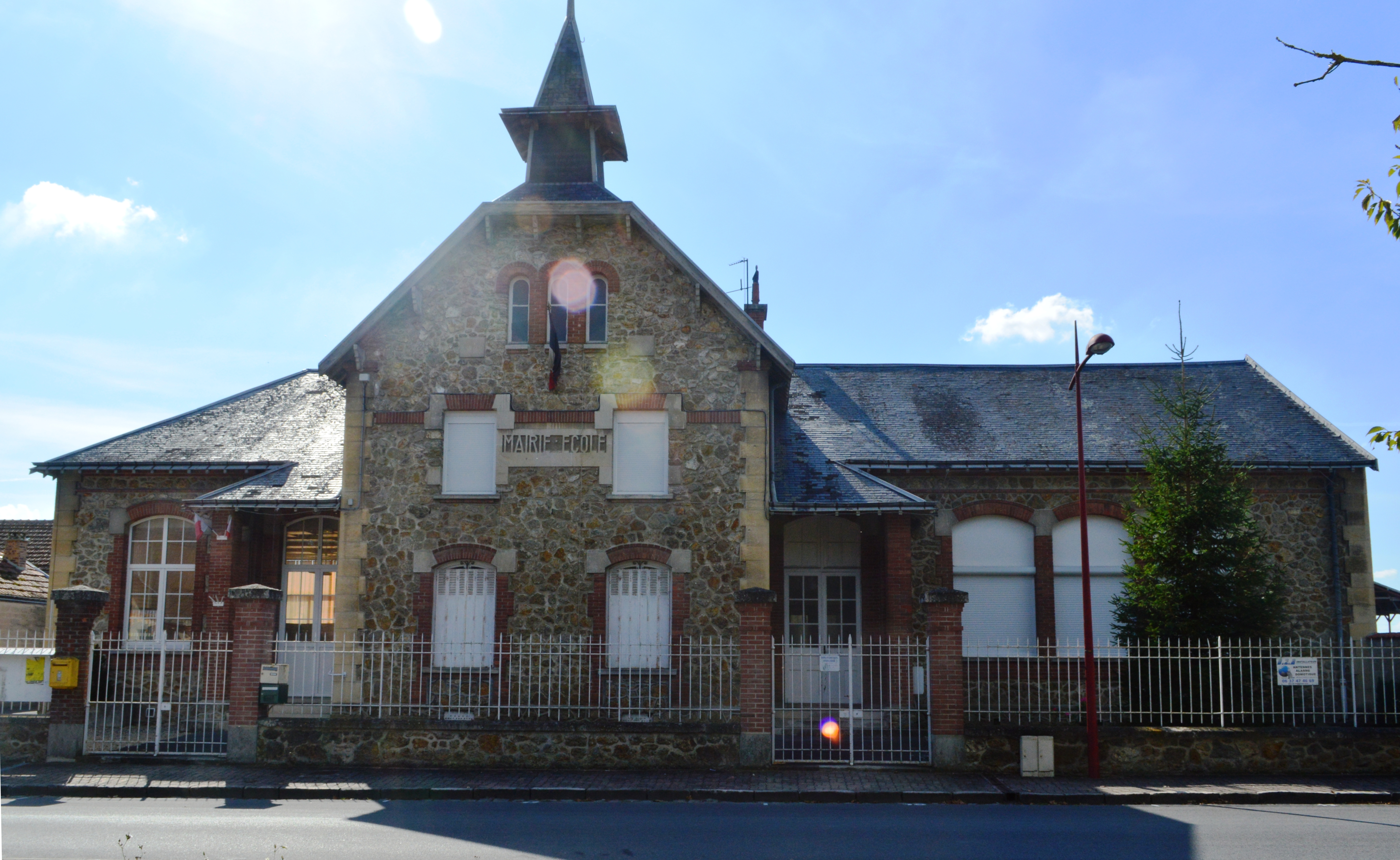
The Town Hall

List of Mayors of Aguilcourt

| In office | | Name | Party |
|---|---|---|---|
| March 2001 | March 2008 | Jean-Marc Le Gouellec | DVG |
| 2008 | 2014 | Gérard Prévôt | DVD |
| 2014 | 2020 | Benoît Aelterman | |
| 2020 | 2026 | Gérard Prévôt | DVD |
| 2026 | incumbent | Paul Mougenot | |

== Population ==
The inhabitants of Aguilcourt are known as Aguilcourtois or Aguilcourtoises in French.

Historical population

| Year | Pop. | ±% p.a. |
|---|---|---|
| 1793 | 156 | — |
| 1821 | 165 | +0.20% |
| 1846 | 309 | +2.54% |
| 1872 | 296 | −0.17% |
| 1901 | 282 | −0.17% |
| 1926 | 319 | +0.49% |
| 1946 | 249 | −1.23% |
| 1962 | 224 | −0.66% |
| 1968 | 242 | +1.30% |

| Year | Pop. | ±% p.a. |
|---|---|---|
| 1975 | 228 | −0.85% |
| 1982 | 252 | +1.44% |
| 1990 | 328 | +3.35% |
| 1999 | 359 | +1.01% |
| 2007 | 339 | −0.71% |
| 2012 | 393 | +3.00% |
| 2017 | 384 | −0.46% |
| 2023 | 417 | +1.38% |

Source: EHESS and INSEE

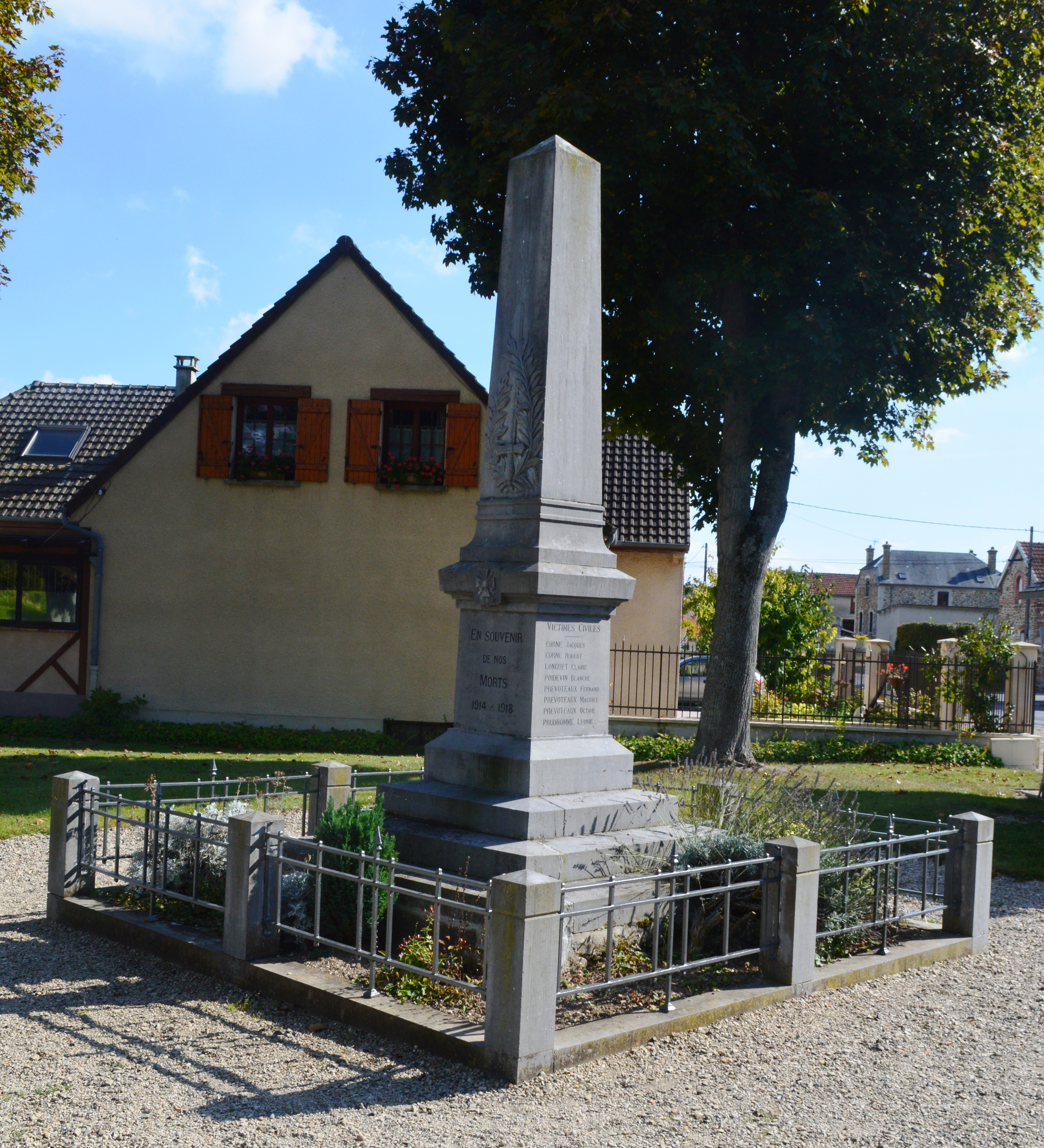
Aguilcourt War Memorial

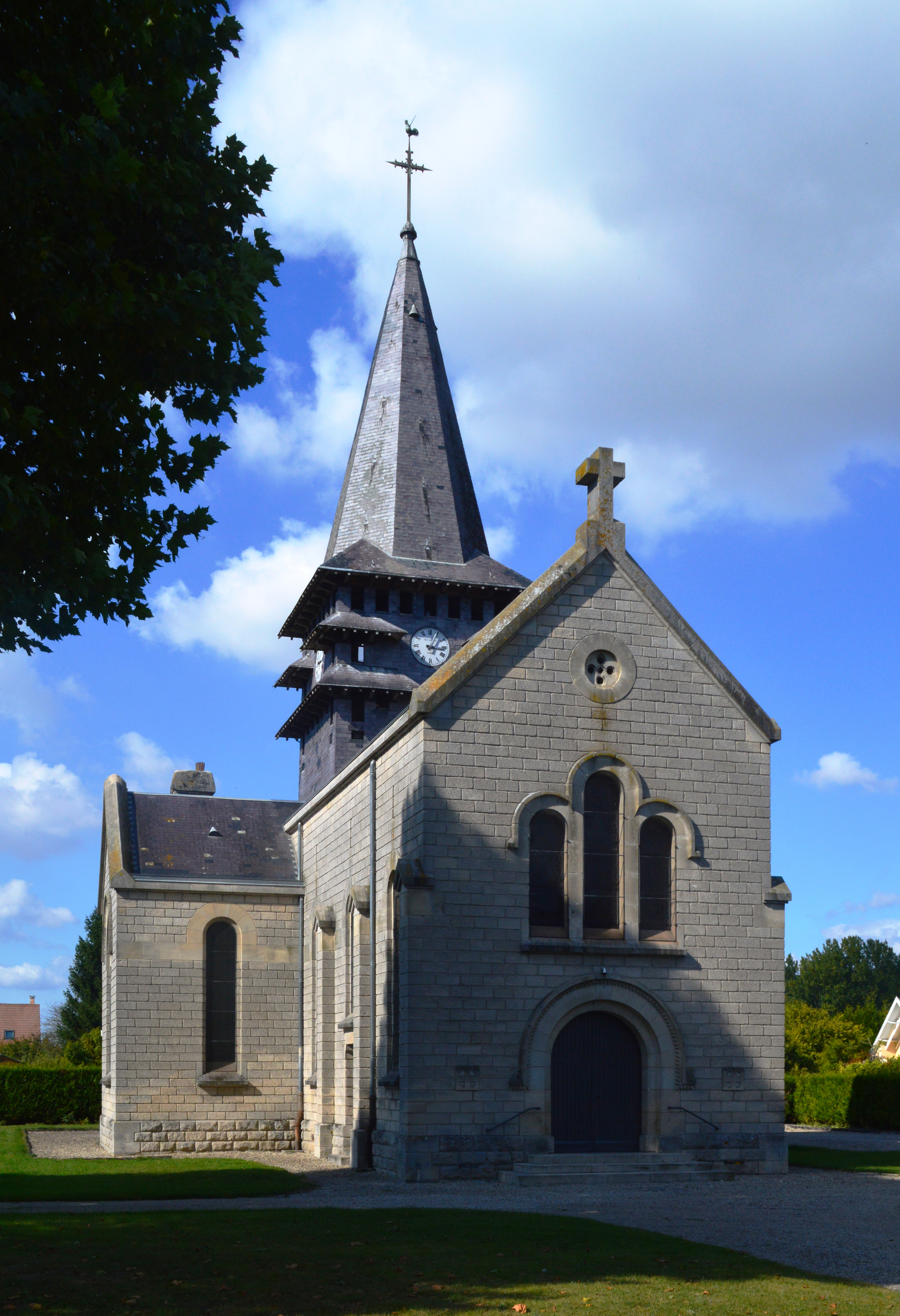
Aguilcourt Church

== See also ==
- Communes of the Aisne department
