= Pontfaverger-Moronvilliers =

- Commune
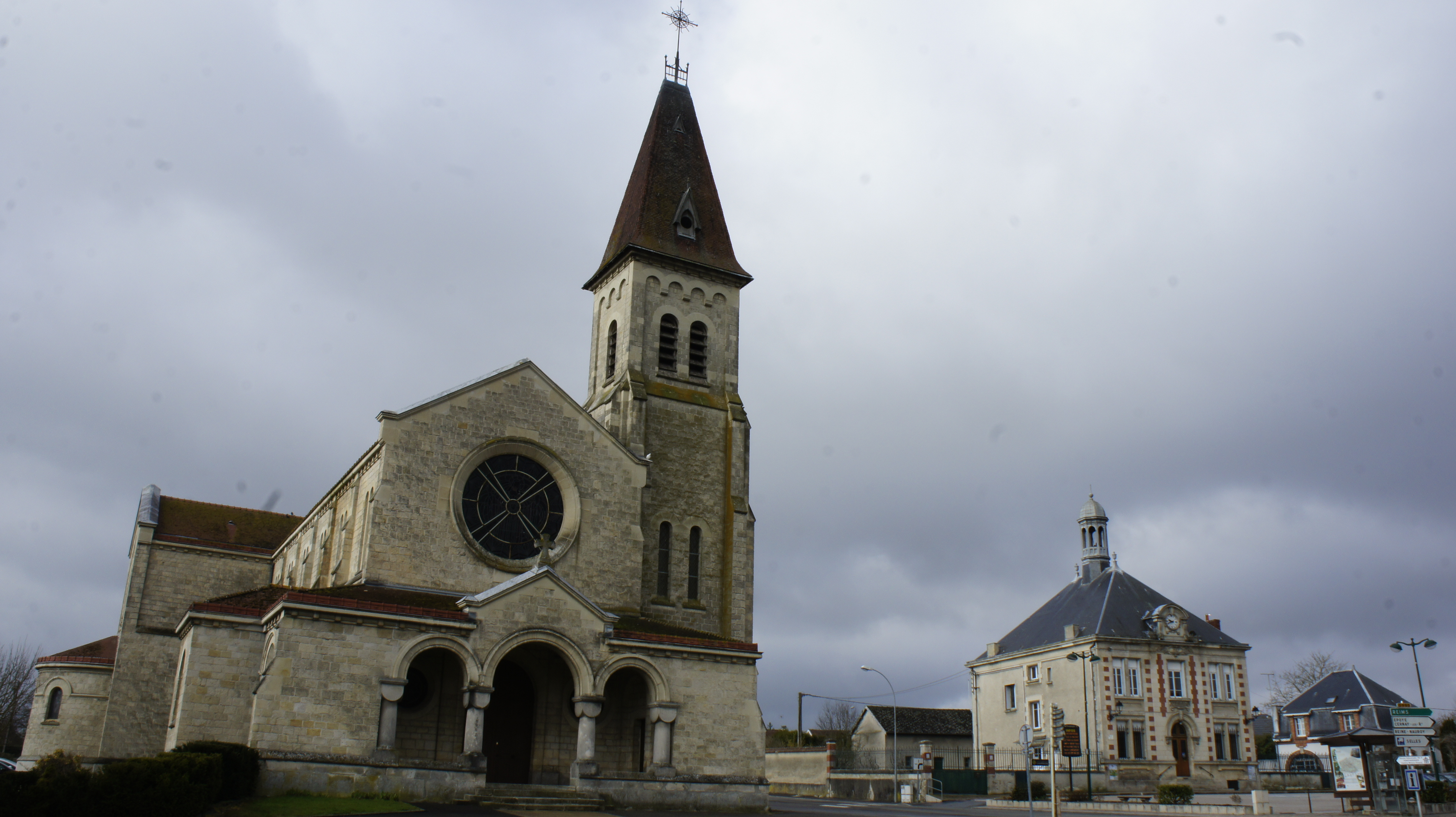
- The church in Pontfaverger

- Coat of arms
- Location of Pontfaverger-Moronvilliers
- Location within France Location within Grand Est
- Coordinates: 49°17′51″N 4°19′13″E
- Country: France
- Region: Grand Est
- Department: Marne
- Arrondissement: Reims
- Canton: Mourmelon-Vesle et Monts de Champagne
- Intercommunality: CU Grand Reims

Government
  - Mayor (2020–2026): Damien Girard
- Area^{1}: 31.52 km^{2} (12.17 sq mi)
- Elevation: 100 m (330 ft)
- Population (2023): 1,734
  - Density: 55.01/km^{2} (142.5/sq mi)
- Time zone: UTC+01:00 (CET)
  - Summer (DST): UTC+02:00 (CEST)
- INSEE/Postal code: 51440 /51490
- ^{1} French Land Register data, which excludes lakes, ponds, glaciers > 1 km^{2} (0.386 sq mi or 247 acres) and river estuaries.

Pontfaverger-Moronvilliers (French pronunciation: [pɔ̃favɛʁʒe mɔʁɔ̃vilje]) is a commune in the Marne department in north-eastern France.

Before 1950, when it absorbed part of the territory of Moronvilliers, its name was Pontfaverger. Moronvilliers was destroyed during World War I and never rebuilt.

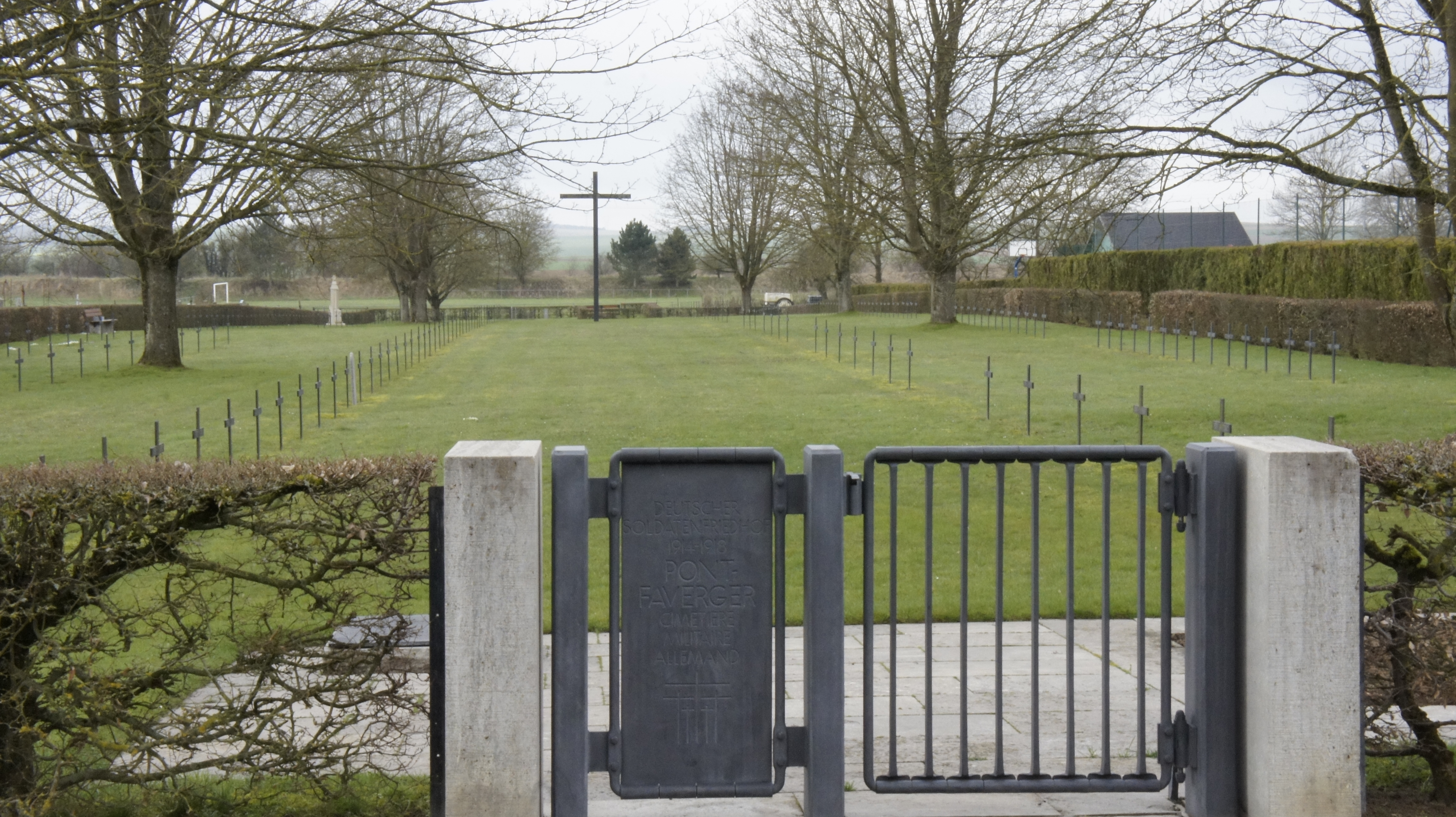
German cemetery, World War I.

== Geography ==
The commune is traversed by the Suippe river.

== See also ==
- Communes of the Marne department
