= Jonchery-sur-Suippe =

- Commune
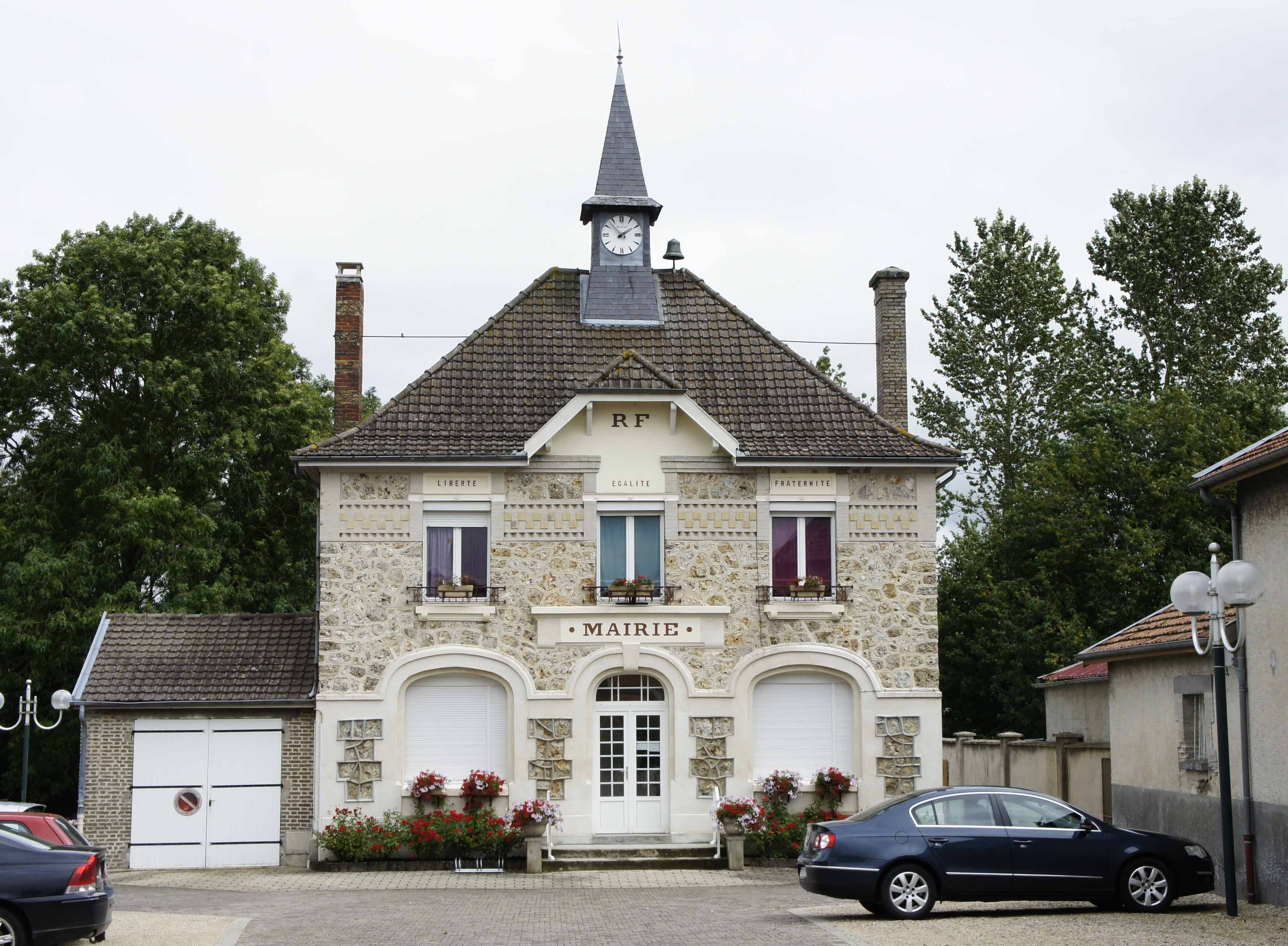
- The town hall in Jonchery-sur-Suippe

- Coat of arms
- Location of Jonchery-sur-Suippe
- Location within France Location within Grand Est
- Coordinates: 49°09′35″N 4°28′33″E
- Country: France
- Region: Grand Est
- Department: Marne
- Arrondissement: Châlons-en-Champagne
- Canton: Argonne Suippe et Vesle
- Intercommunality: Région de Suippes

Government
  - Mayor (2020–2026): Roland Bouverot
- Area^{1}: 24.74 km^{2} (9.55 sq mi)
- Elevation: 128 m (420 ft)
- Population (2023): 223
  - Density: 9.01/km^{2} (23.3/sq mi)
- Time zone: UTC+01:00 (CET)
  - Summer (DST): UTC+02:00 (CEST)
- INSEE/Postal code: 51307 /51600
- ^{1} French Land Register data, which excludes lakes, ponds, glaciers > 1 km^{2} (0.386 sq mi or 247 acres) and river estuaries.

Jonchery-sur-Suippe (French pronunciation: [ʒɔ̃ʃʁi syʁ sɥip], literally Jonchery on Suippe) is a commune in the Marne department in north-eastern France.

== Geography ==
The commune is traversed by the river Suippe.

== See also ==
- Communes of the Marne department
