= Suippe =

River in France

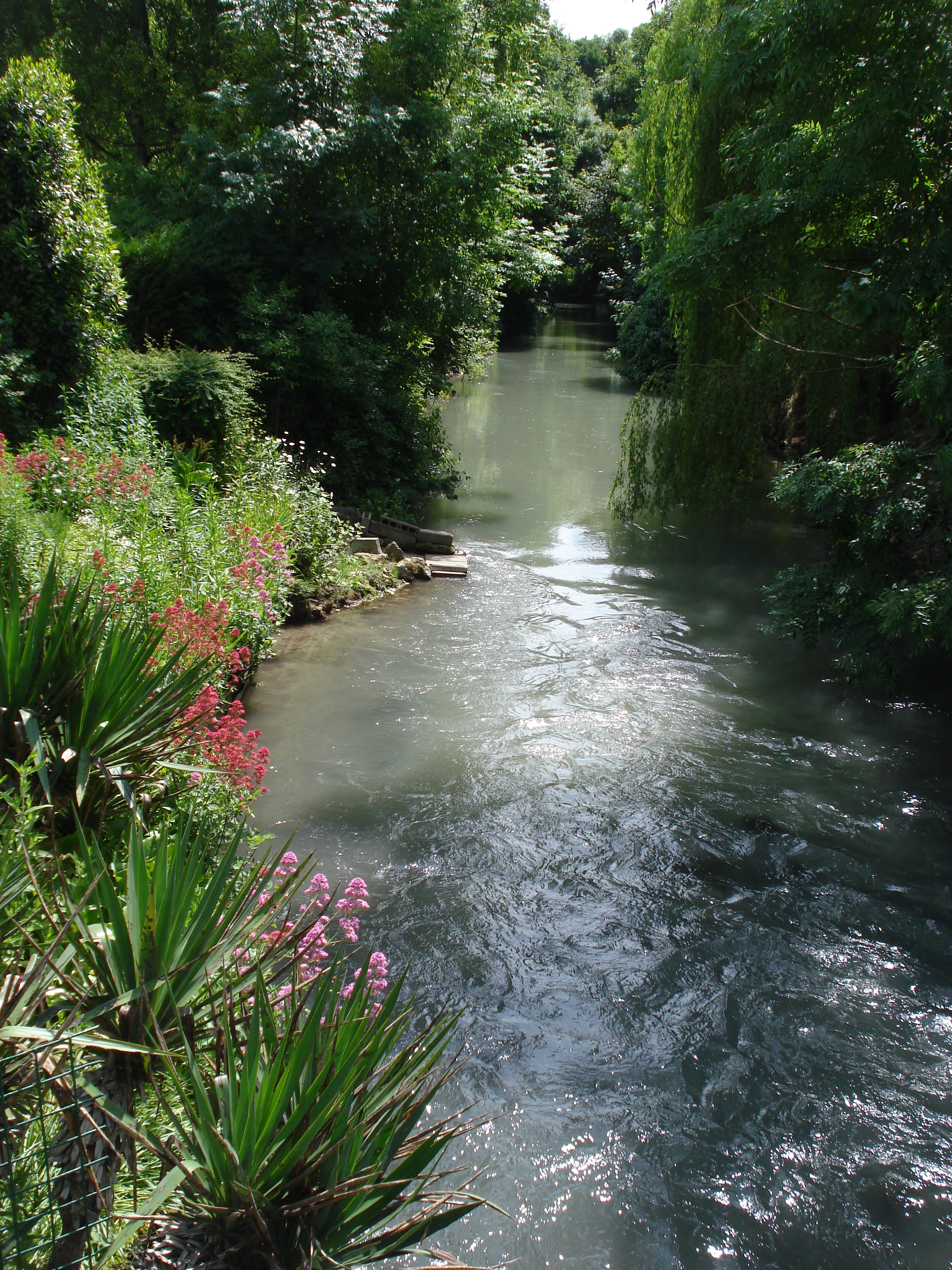
- The Suippe at Pontfaverger-Moronvilliers

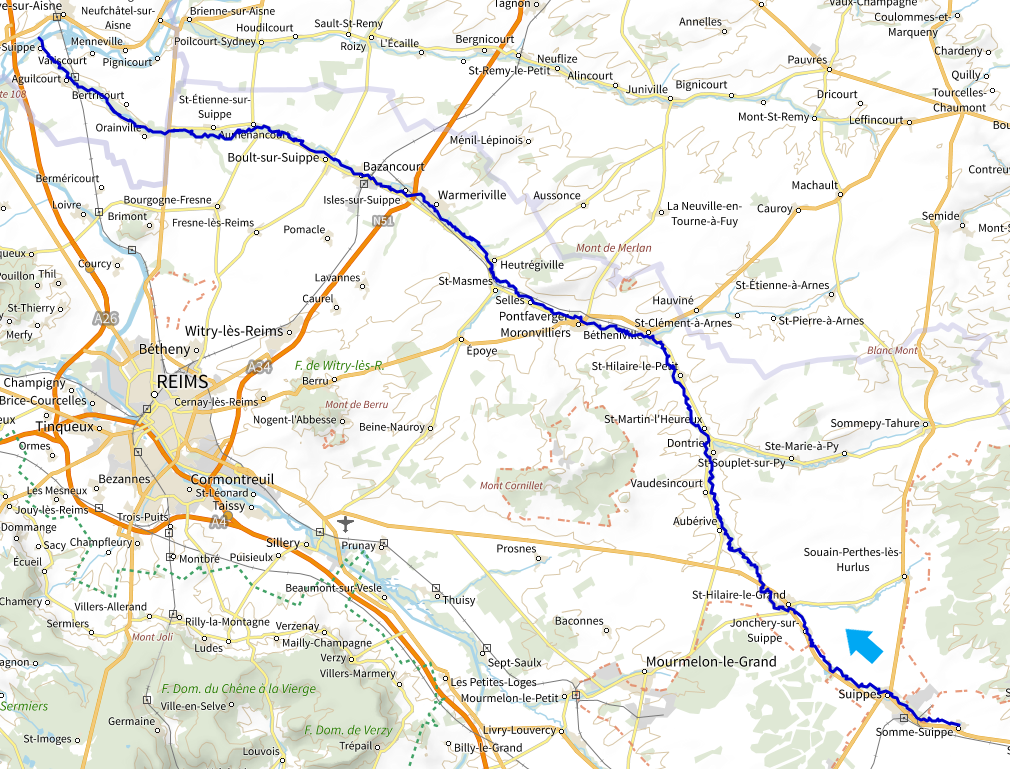

Location
- Country: France

Physical characteristics
- Source
  - location: In Somme-Suippe
  - coordinates: 49°06′51″N 04°34′53″E
  - elevation: 135 m (443 ft)
- Mouth
  - location: Aisne
  - coordinates: 49°25′29″N 03°56′58″E
  - elevation: 51 m (167 ft)
- Length: 81.7 km (50.8 mi)
- Basin size: 802 km^{2} (310 sq mi)
- Discharge
  - average: 4.34 m^{3}/s (153 cu ft/s)

Basin features
- Progression: Aisne→ Oise→ Seine→ English Channel

The Suippe (French pronunciation: [sɥip]) is an 81.7 km (50.8 mi) long river in the Marne and Aisne departments of north-eastern France. Its source is at Somme-Suippe. It flows generally northwest. It is a left tributary of the Aisne, into which it flows at Condé-sur-Suippe.

== Departments and communes it runs through ==
(ordered from source to mouth)

- Marne: Somme-Suippe, Suippes, Jonchery-sur-Suippe, Saint-Hilaire-le-Grand, Aubérive, Vaudesincourt, Dontrien, Saint-Martin-l'Heureux, Saint-Hilaire-le-Petit, Bétheniville, Pontfaverger-Moronvilliers, Selles, Saint-Masmes, Heutrégiville, Warmeriville, Isles-sur-Suippe, Bazancourt, Boult-sur-Suippe, Saint-Étienne-sur-Suippe, Bourgogne, Auménancourt.
- Aisne: Orainville, Bertricourt, Variscourt, Aguilcourt, Condé-sur-Suippe.
