= Saint-Masmes =

- Commune
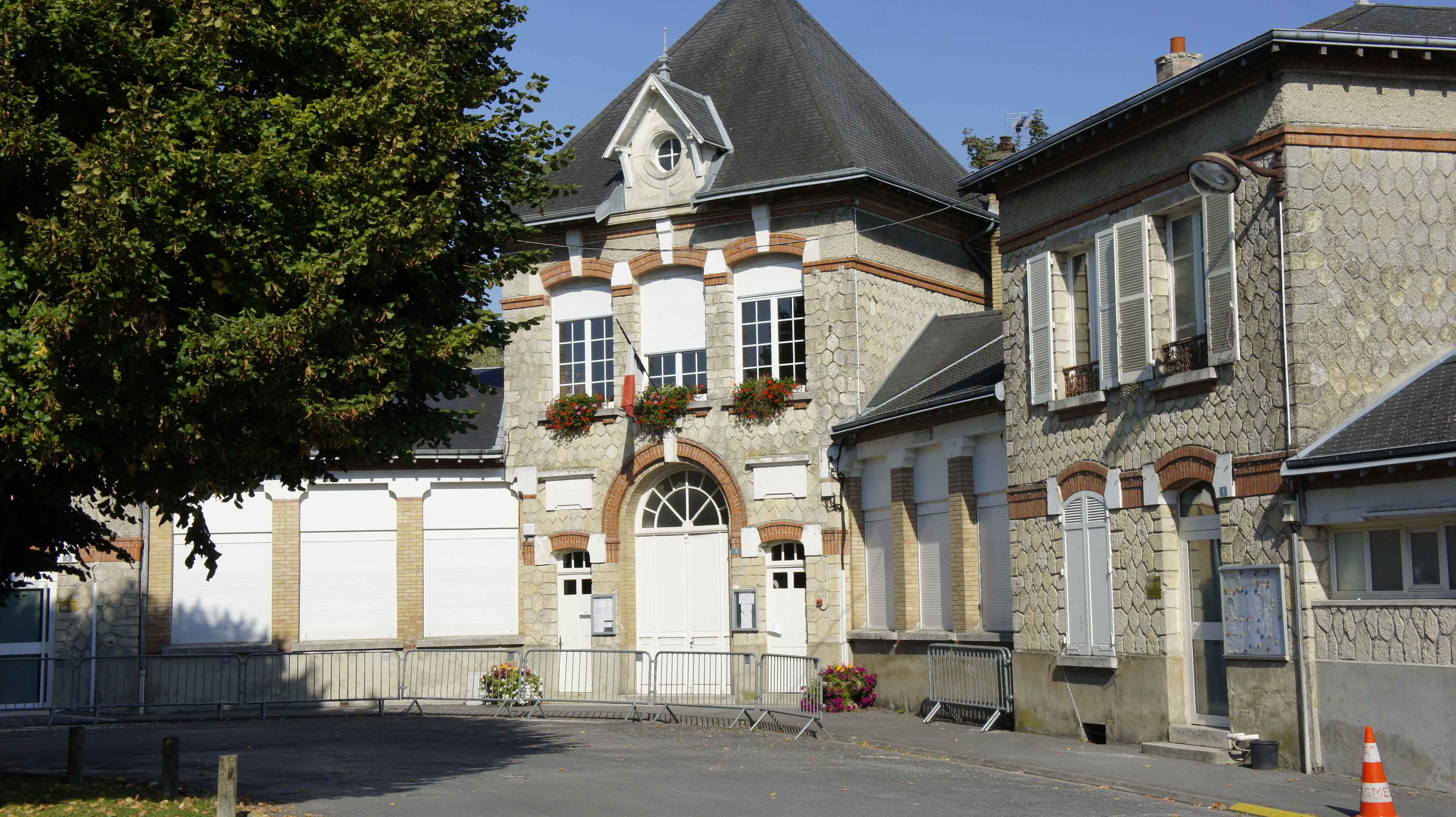
- The town hall in Saint-Masmes

- Coat of arms
- Location of Saint-Masmes
- Location within France Location within Grand Est
- Coordinates: 49°18′45″N 4°15′47″E
- Country: France
- Region: Grand Est
- Department: Marne
- Arrondissement: Reims
- Canton: Mourmelon-Vesle et Monts de Champagne
- Intercommunality: CU Grand Reims

Government
  - Mayor (2020–2026): Hervé Chef
- Area^{1}: 6.58 km^{2} (2.54 sq mi)
- Elevation: 87 m (285 ft)
- Population (2023): 550
  - Density: 84/km^{2} (220/sq mi)
- Time zone: UTC+01:00 (CET)
  - Summer (DST): UTC+02:00 (CEST)
- INSEE/Postal code: 51505 /51490
- ^{1} French Land Register data, which excludes lakes, ponds, glaciers > 1 km^{2} (0.386 sq mi or 247 acres) and river estuaries.

Saint-Masmes (French pronunciation: [sɛ̃ mam]) is a commune in the Marne department in north-eastern France.

== Geography ==
The commune is traversed by the Suippe river.

== See also ==
- Communes of the Marne department
