= Saint-Martin-l'Heureux =

- Commune
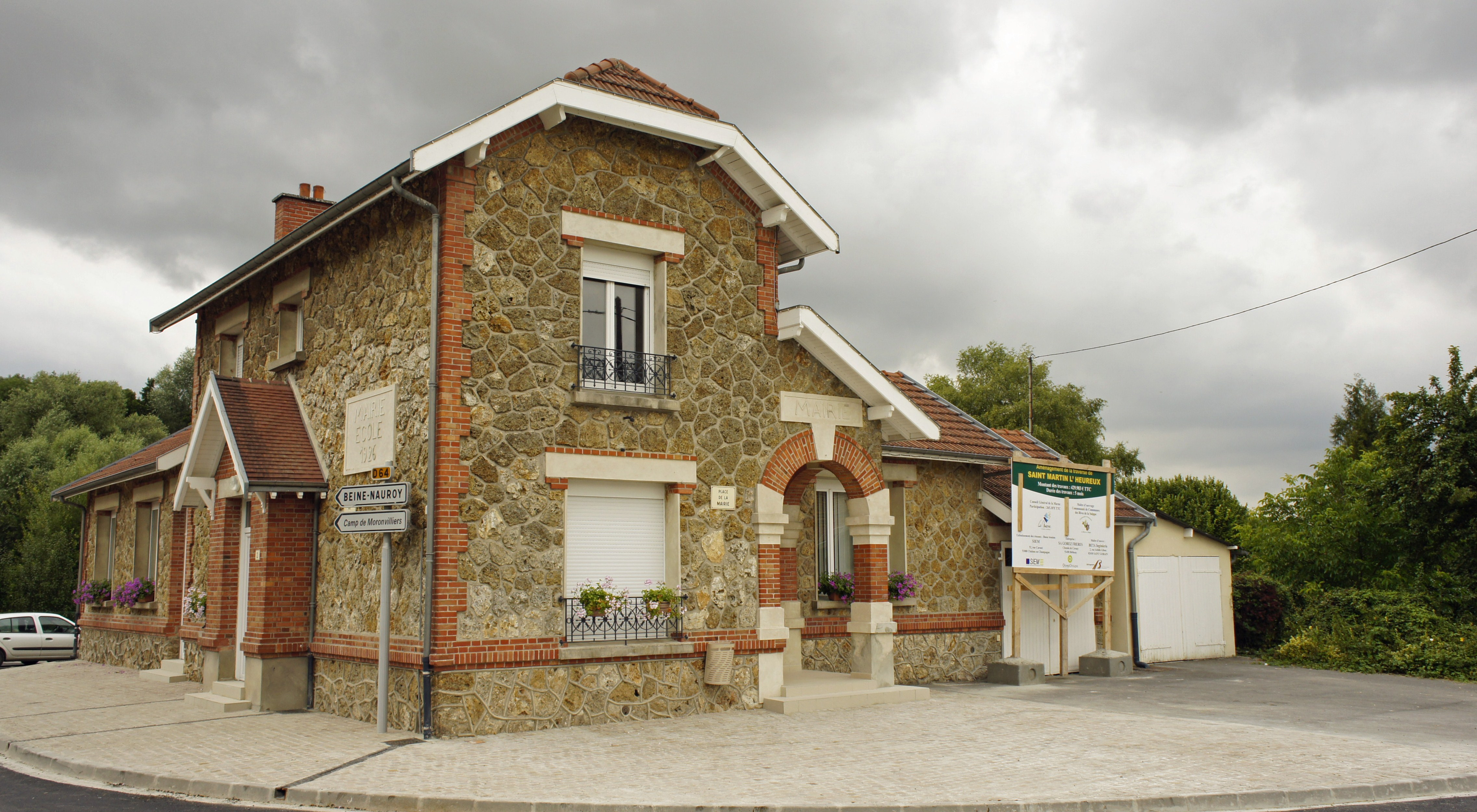
- The town hall in Saint-Martin-l'Heureux
- Location of Saint-Martin-l'Heureux
- Location within France Location within Grand Est
- Coordinates: 49°15′03″N 4°24′25″E
- Country: France
- Region: Grand Est
- Department: Marne
- Arrondissement: Reims
- Canton: Mourmelon-Vesle et Monts de Champagne
- Intercommunality: CU Grand Reims

Government
  - Mayor (2020–2026): François Baronnet
- Area^{1}: 13.66 km^{2} (5.27 sq mi)
- Elevation: 105 m (344 ft)
- Population (2023): 100
  - Density: 7.3/km^{2} (19/sq mi)
- Time zone: UTC+01:00 (CET)
  - Summer (DST): UTC+02:00 (CEST)
- INSEE/Postal code: 51503 /51490
- ^{1} French Land Register data, which excludes lakes, ponds, glaciers > 1 km^{2} (0.386 sq mi or 247 acres) and river estuaries.

Saint-Martin-l'Heureux (French pronunciation: [sɛ̃ maʁtɛ̃ løʁø]) is a commune in the Marne department in north-eastern France.

== Geography ==
The commune is traversed by the Suippe river.

== See also ==
- Communes of the Marne department
