= Bertricourt =

- Commune
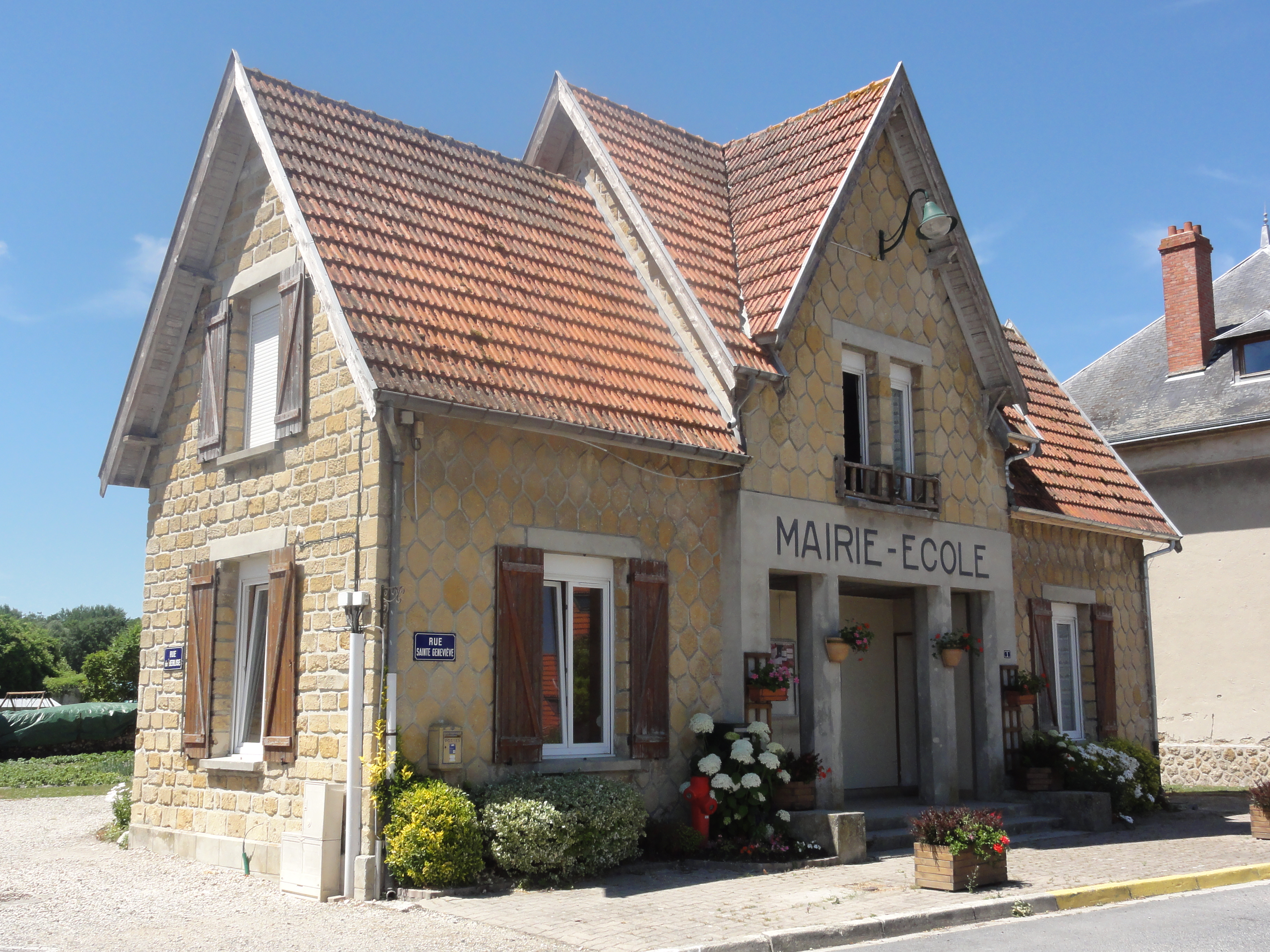
- Town hall and school

- Coat of arms
- Location of Bertricourt
- Location within France Location within Hauts-de-France
- Coordinates: 49°23′44″N 4°00′35″E
- Country: France
- Region: Hauts-de-France
- Department: Aisne
- Arrondissement: Laon
- Canton: Villeneuve-sur-Aisne
- Intercommunality: Champagne Picarde

Government
  - Mayor (2026–32): Hervé Bollinne
- Area^{1}: 4.48 km^{2} (1.73 sq mi)
- Elevation: 70 m (230 ft)
- Highest elevation: 76 m (249 ft)
- Lowest elevation: 57 m (187 ft)
- Population (2023): 159
  - Density: 35.5/km^{2} (91.9/sq mi)
- Time zone: UTC+01:00 (CET)
  - Summer (DST): UTC+02:00 (CEST)
- INSEE/Postal code: 02076 /02190
- ^{1} French Land Register data, which excludes lakes, ponds, glaciers > 1 km^{2} (0.386 sq mi or 247 acres) and river estuaries.

Bertricourt (French pronunciation: [bɛʁtʁikuʁ]) is a commune in the department of Aisne in Hauts-de-France in northern France.

== Geography ==
The Suippe forms most of the commune's southwestern border.

== Population ==
Historical population
Year	Pop.	±% p.a.
1968	52	—
1975	55	+0.80%
1982	59	+1.01%
1990	66	+1.41%
1999	70	+0.66%
2007	133	+8.35%
2012	169	+4.91%
2017	162	−0.84%
2023	159	−0.31%
Source: INSEE

== See also ==
- Communes of the Aisne department
