= Condé-sur-Suippe =

- Commune
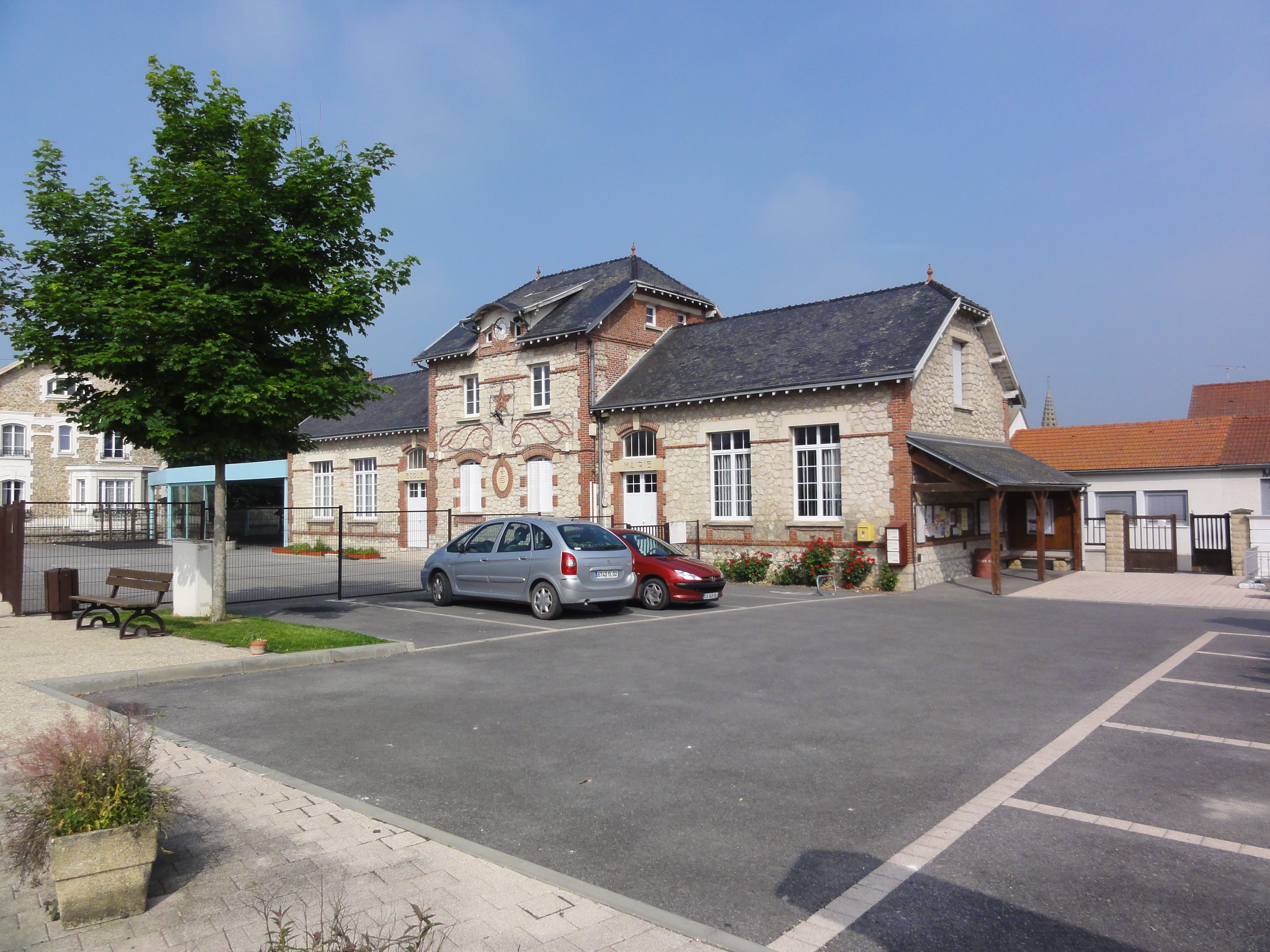
- Town hall
- Location of Condé-sur-Suippe
- Location within France Location within Hauts-de-France
- Coordinates: 49°25′15″N 3°57′03″E
- Country: France
- Region: Hauts-de-France
- Department: Aisne
- Arrondissement: Laon
- Canton: Villeneuve-sur-Aisne
- Intercommunality: Champagne Picarde

Government
  - Mayor (2026–32): Francis Quélin
- Area^{1}: 5.83 km^{2} (2.25 sq mi)
- Elevation: 56 m (184 ft)
- Highest elevation: 86 m (282 ft)
- Lowest elevation: 51 m (167 ft)
- Population (2023): 357
  - Density: 61.2/km^{2} (159/sq mi)
- Time zone: UTC+01:00 (CET)
  - Summer (DST): UTC+02:00 (CEST)
- INSEE/Postal code: 02211 /02190
- ^{1} French Land Register data, which excludes lakes, ponds, glaciers > 1 km^{2} (0.386 sq mi or 247 acres) and river estuaries.

Condé-sur-Suippe (French pronunciation: [kɔ̃de syʁ sɥip], literally Condé on Suippe) is a commune in the Aisne department in Hauts-de-France in northern France.

== Geography ==
The river Suippe flows northwest through the northern part of the commune, then flows into the Aisne.

== Population ==
Historical population
Year	Pop.	±% p.a.
1968	384	—
1975	312	−2.92%
1982	341	+1.28%
1990	279	−2.48%
1999	260	−0.78%
2007	245	−0.74%
2012	222	−1.95%
2017	285	+5.12%
2023	357	+3.83%
Source: INSEE

== See also ==
- Communes of the Aisne department
