= Vaudesincourt =

- Commune
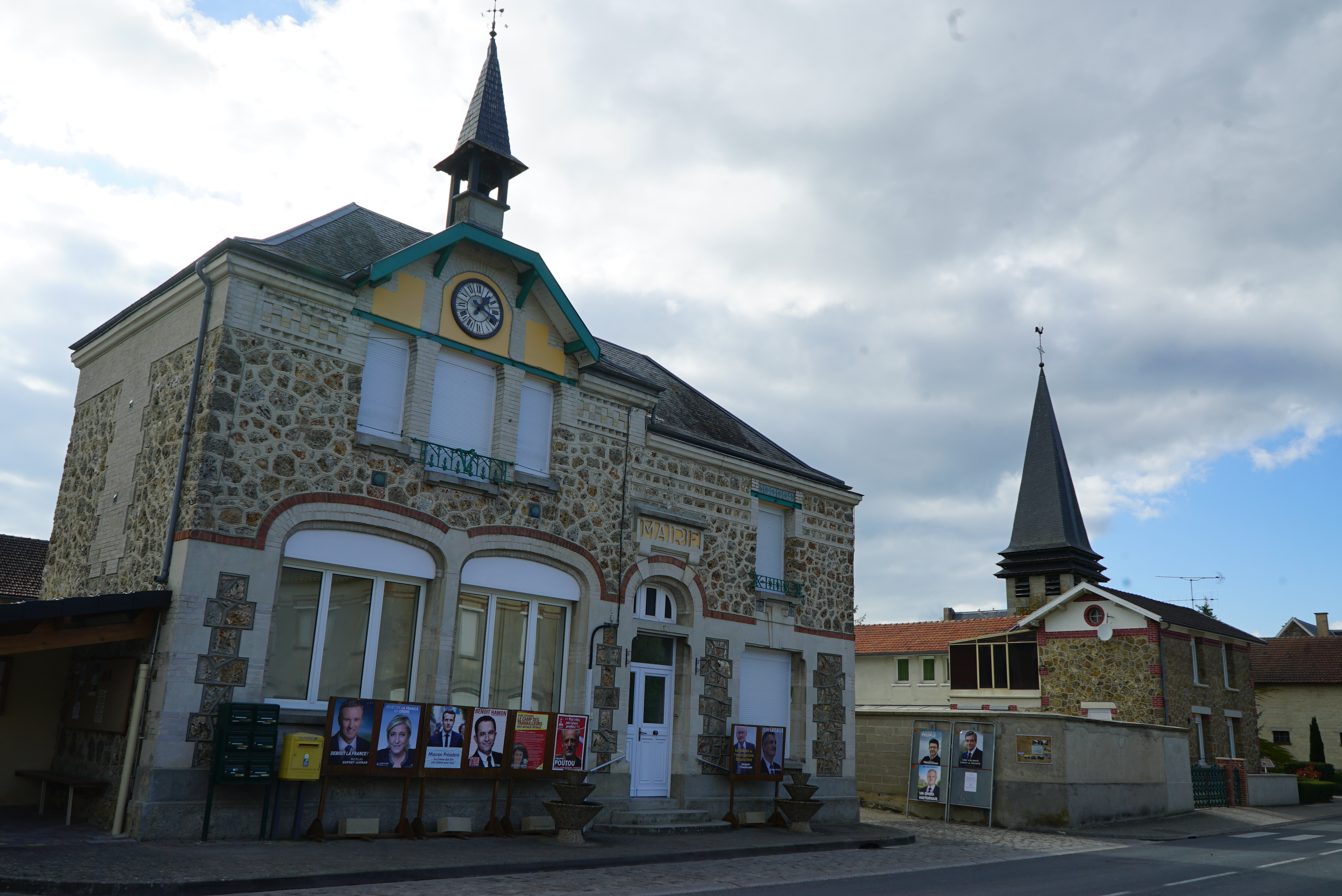
- The town hall and church in Vaudesincourt

- Coat of arms
- Location of Vaudesincourt
- Location within France Location within Grand Est
- Coordinates: 49°13′19″N 4°24′26″E
- Country: France
- Region: Grand Est
- Department: Marne
- Arrondissement: Reims
- Canton: Mourmelon-Vesle et Monts de Champagne
- Intercommunality: CU Grand Reims

Government
  - Mayor (2020–2026): Thibault Locquard
- Area^{1}: 12.64 km^{2} (4.88 sq mi)
- Elevation: 110 m (360 ft)
- Population (2023): 110
  - Density: 8.7/km^{2} (23/sq mi)
- Time zone: UTC+01:00 (CET)
  - Summer (DST): UTC+02:00 (CEST)
- INSEE/Postal code: 51600 /51600
- ^{1} French Land Register data, which excludes lakes, ponds, glaciers > 1 km^{2} (0.386 sq mi or 247 acres) and river estuaries.

Vaudesincourt (French pronunciation: [vod(ə)zɛ̃kuʁ]) is a commune in the Marne department in north-eastern France.

== Geography ==
The commune is traversed by the Suippe river.

== See also ==
- Communes of the Marne department
