= Saint-Hilaire-le-Grand =

- Commune
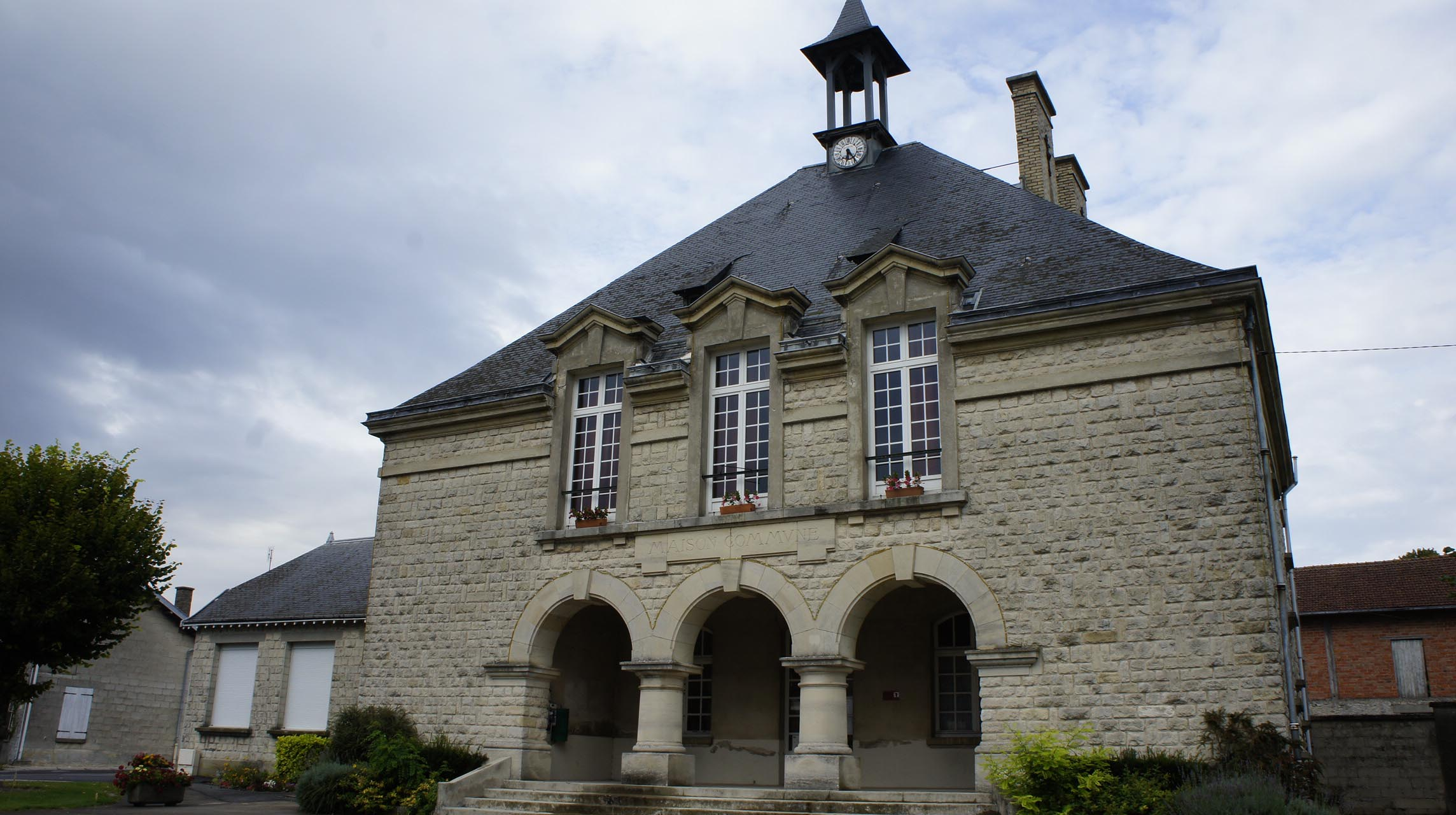
- The town hall in Saint-Hilaire-le-Grand
- Location of Saint-Hilaire-le-Grand
- Location within France Location within Grand Est
- Coordinates: 49°10′19″N 4°27′52″E
- Country: France
- Region: Grand Est
- Department: Marne
- Arrondissement: Châlons-en-Champagne
- Canton: Argonne Suippe et Vesle
- Intercommunality: Région de Suippes

Government
  - Mayor (2020–2026): Antonia Paquola
- Area^{1}: 42.39 km^{2} (16.37 sq mi)
- Elevation: 120 m (390 ft)
- Population (2023): 349
  - Density: 8.23/km^{2} (21.3/sq mi)
- Time zone: UTC+01:00 (CET)
  - Summer (DST): UTC+02:00 (CEST)
- INSEE/Postal code: 51486 /51600
- ^{1} French Land Register data, which excludes lakes, ponds, glaciers > 1 km^{2} (0.386 sq mi or 247 acres) and river estuaries.

Saint-Hilaire-le-Grand (French pronunciation: [sɛ̃.t‿ilɛʁ lə ɡʁɑ̃]) is a commune in the Marne department in north-eastern France.

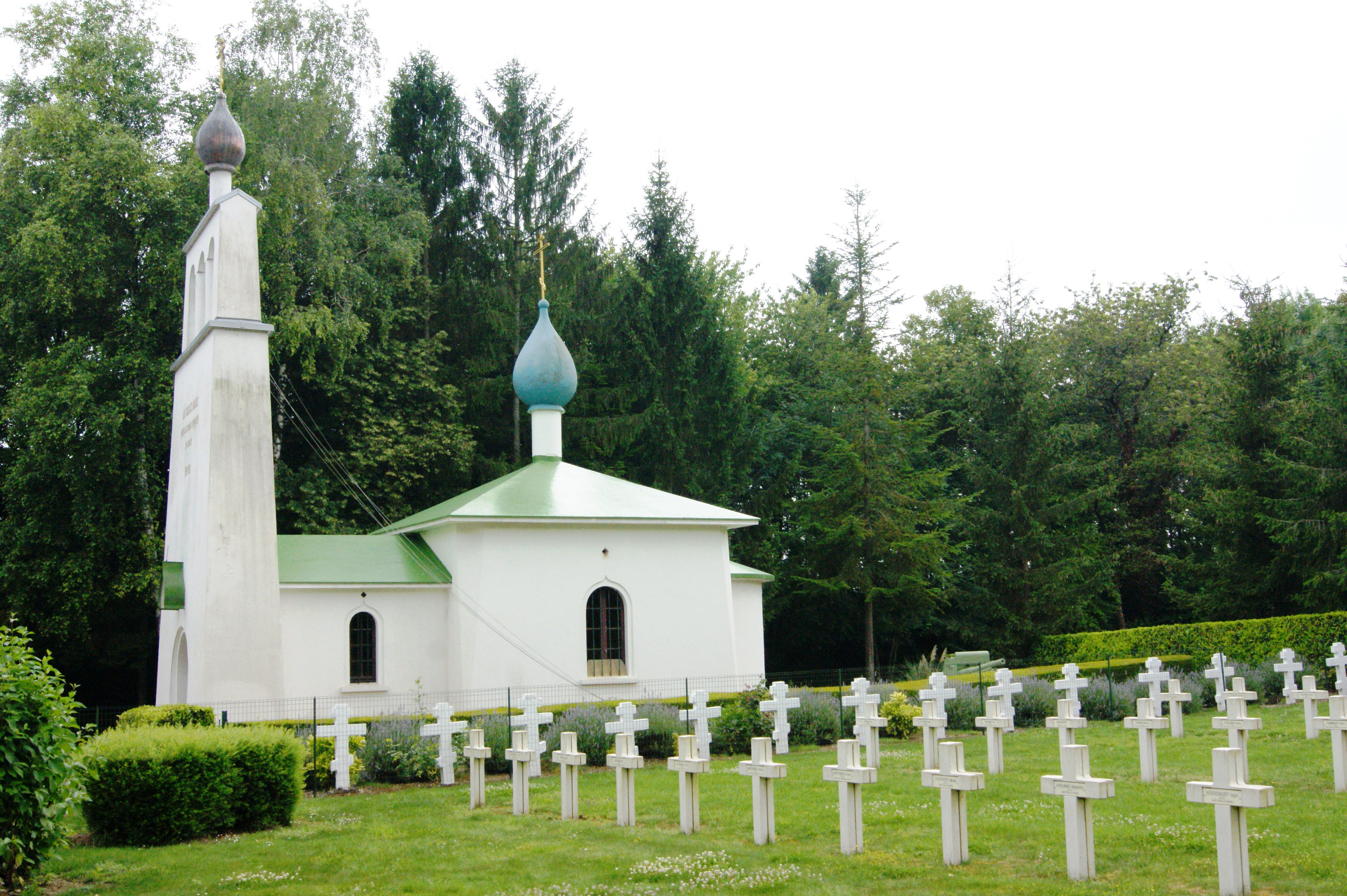
Russian cemetery.

== Geography ==
The commune is traversed by the Suippe river.

== See also ==
- Communes of the Marne department
