= Saint-Hilaire-le-Petit =

- Commune
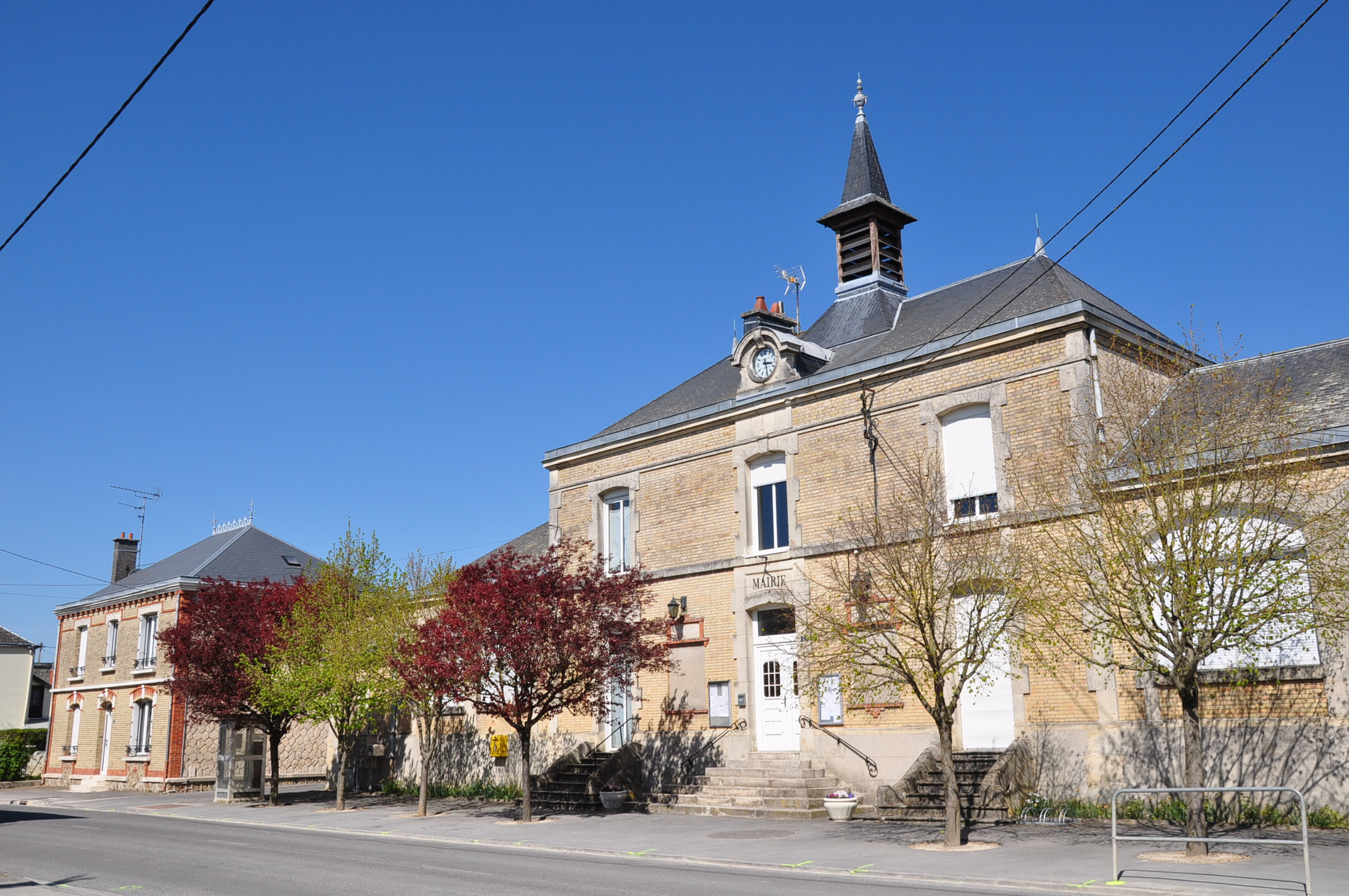
- The town hall in Saint-Hilaire-le-Petit
- Location of Saint-Hilaire-le-Petit
- Location within France Location within Grand Est
- Coordinates: 49°16′28″N 4°23′26″E
- Country: France
- Region: Grand Est
- Department: Marne
- Arrondissement: Reims
- Canton: Mourmelon-Vesle et Monts de Champagne
- Intercommunality: CU Grand Reims

Government
  - Mayor (2020–2026): Jean-Pierre Grisouard
- Area^{1}: 22.76 km^{2} (8.79 sq mi)
- Elevation: 104 m (341 ft)
- Population (2023): 356
  - Density: 15.6/km^{2} (40.5/sq mi)
- Time zone: UTC+01:00 (CET)
  - Summer (DST): UTC+02:00 (CEST)
- INSEE/Postal code: 51487 /51490
- ^{1} French Land Register data, which excludes lakes, ponds, glaciers > 1 km^{2} (0.386 sq mi or 247 acres) and river estuaries.

Saint-Hilaire-le-Petit (French pronunciation: [sɛ̃.t‿ilɛʁ lə pəti]) is a commune in the Marne department in north-eastern France.

== Geography ==
The commune is traversed by the Suippe river.

== See also ==
- Communes of the Marne department
