= Orainville =

- Commune
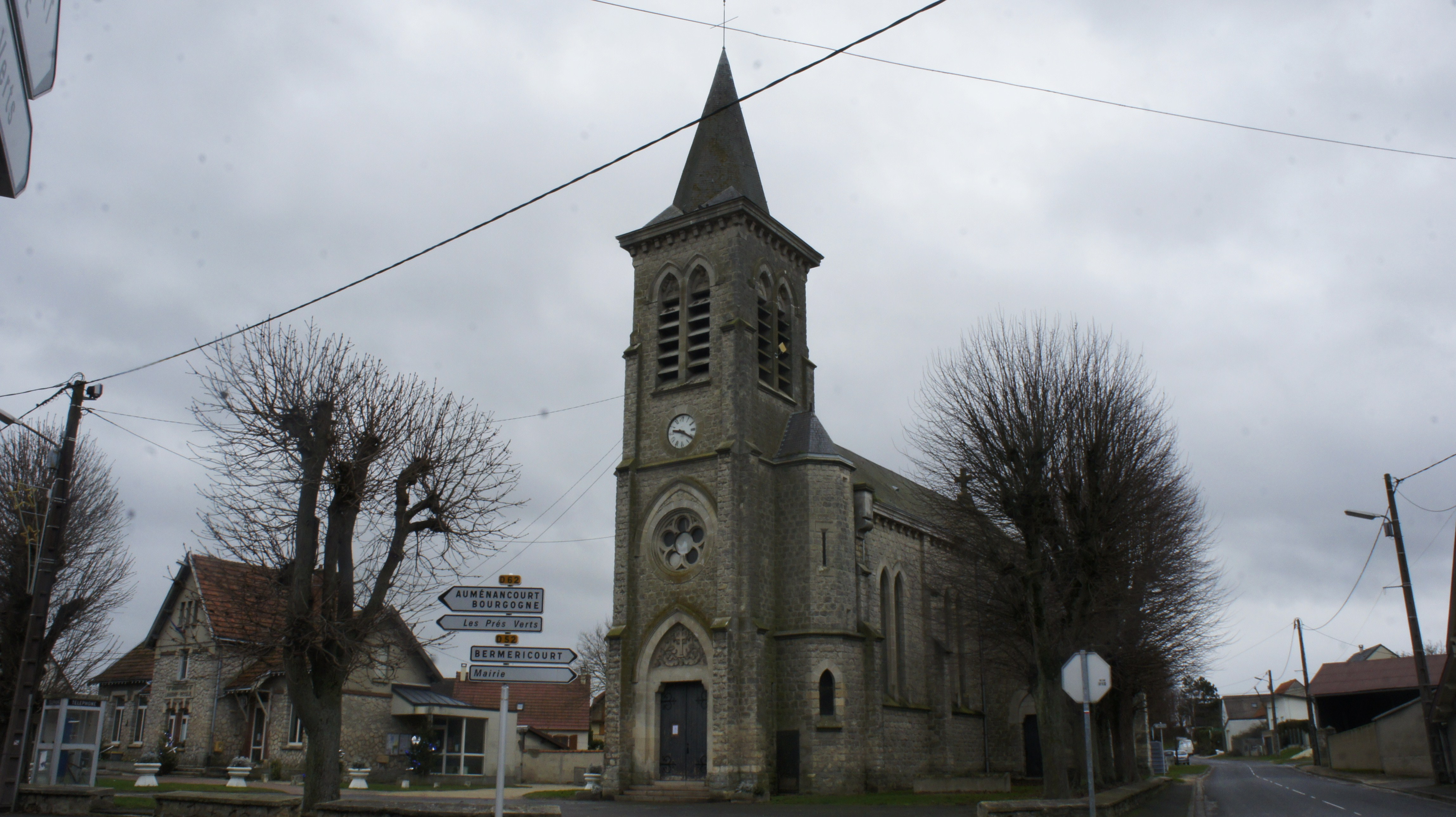
- The town hall and church of Orainville

- Coat of arms
- Location of Orainville
- Location within France Location within Hauts-de-France
- Coordinates: 49°22′53″N 4°01′19″E
- Country: France
- Region: Hauts-de-France
- Department: Aisne
- Arrondissement: Laon
- Canton: Villeneuve-sur-Aisne
- Intercommunality: Champagne Picarde

Government
  - Mayor (2026–32): Alain Malinowski
- Area^{1}: 8.69 km^{2} (3.36 sq mi)
- Elevation: 67 m (220 ft)
- Highest elevation: 89 m (292 ft)
- Lowest elevation: 57 m (187 ft)
- Population (2023): 490
  - Density: 56/km^{2} (150/sq mi)
- Time zone: UTC+01:00 (CET)
  - Summer (DST): UTC+02:00 (CEST)
- INSEE/Postal code: 02572 /02190
- ^{1} French Land Register data, which excludes lakes, ponds, glaciers > 1 km^{2} (0.386 sq mi or 247 acres) and river estuaries.

Orainville (French pronunciation: [ɔʁɛ̃vil]) is a commune in the Aisne department in Hauts-de-France in northern France.

== Geography ==
The commune is traversed by the Suippe river.

== Population ==
Historical population
Year	Pop.	±% p.a.
1968	192	—
1975	209	+1.22%
1982	271	+3.78%
1990	277	+0.27%
1999	339	+2.27%
2007	459	+3.86%
2012	508	+2.05%
2017	507	−0.04%
2023	490	−0.57%
Source: INSEE

== See also ==
- Communes of the Aisne department
