= List of World War I memorials and cemeteries in Champagne-Ardenne =

This is the List of World War I memorials and cemeteries in Champagne-Ardenne.

The modern-day Champagne-Ardenne, bordering Belgium in northeast France, covers four departments: Aube, Ardennes, Haute-Marne, and Marne. This region saw much fighting in World War I (1914–1918) and many battles, of which arguably the most important were the First Battle of the Marne and the Second Battle of the Marne. The First Battle of the Marne, also known as the Miracle of the Marne, was fought between 5 and 12 September 1914. The battle effectively ended the month-long German offensive that had opened the war and the counterattack of six French field armies and the British Expeditionary Force (BEF) along the Marne River forced the German Imperial Army to abandon its push on Paris and retreat northeast to the Aisne river, setting the stage for four years of trench warfare on the Western Front

The Second Battle of the Marne (a.k.a. the Battle of Reims), fought from 15 July to 6 August 1918, was the last major German attack of their five-phase Spring Offensive. The German attack failed when an Allied counterattack led by French forces and including several hundred tanks overwhelmed the Germans on their right flank, inflicting severe casualties. The German defeat marked the start of the relentless Allied advance of the Hundred Days Offensive which culminated in the Armistice.

Needing to come to terms with the loss of so many lives in the conflict, particularly those whose remains went unidentified, war memorials – known in France as monuments aux morts, literally "monuments to the dead" – became a focal point and replaced individual graves and gravestones. Between 1919 and 1926, many thousands of memorials were erected throughout France, including large national monuments, civic memorials, war cemeteries, private memorials, halls and parks. Ceremonies are often held at the memorials, including those on Armistice Day and the Fêtes de la Victoire.

== Battles of the Marne ==
=== Memorial to the First Battle of the Marne at Mondemont ===
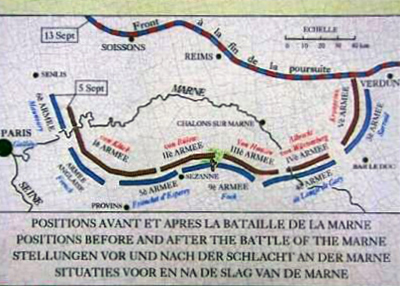
Map covering First Battle of the Marne which is on public display at the Mondemont monument

Memorial to the First Battle of the Marne at Mondemont
The memorial at Mondemont commemorates the First Battle of the Marne, fought from 5 to 12 September 1914. Its location is on the site of the Château de Mondement, south of the marshes of St Gond. On 6 September 1917, President of the Republic Raymond Poincaré held a ceremony here to commemorate the third anniversary of the battle. The French parliament subsequently voted Mondemont as the preferred site for the memorial.

In 1929, the Beaux-Arts administration organised a competition to select a suitable design for the memorial. Eventually, the commission went to the architect Paul Bigot who proposed Henri Bouchard for the main sculptural work. The monument was to take the form of a huge column to symbolise the significance of the German advance being halted, and at the top there would be a sculpture in relief of an "Angel of Victory" which would be assigned to Bouchard while bas-reliefs at the base would be assigned to established sculptors Alfred Bottiau, Albert Patrisse and René André Duparc.

In December 1933, the monument was completed, but there had been difficulty in raising funds to complete the sculpture. The monument remained covered in scaffolding until 1938 when its sculptural work was completed. The inauguration was set for 19 September 1939, but the outbreak of World War II delayed this until 23 September 1951.

The monument rises to a height of 35.5 metres (116 ft) and its concrete is pink in colour. The whole monument with its metal base and deep foundations weighed 2000 tonnes. The monument's scale evokes both power and defiance, as the designer had intended.

At the base, bas-reliefs featured depictions of all the main Generals involved in the battle, with Joseph Joffre in the centre, his arm around a French soldier. Around him, Joffre's generals are positioned in the geographical order (from Verdun to Senlis) that they held in the battle. From left to right they are Generals Sarrail (Third Army), Langle de Cary (Fourth Army), Foch (Ninth Army), Franchet d'Espèrey (Fifth Army), Field Marshal French (BEF), Manoury (Sixth Army) and Gallieni (The Army of Paris).

There are two main inscriptions on the column:

"A la voix de Joffre, l'armée française en pleine retraite s'arrêta et fit face à l'ennemi. alors se déchaîna la bataille de la Marne sur un front de soixante dix lieues de Verdun aux portes de Paris. Après plusieurs jours de luttes héroïques, l'ennemi de toutes parts battait en retraite et sur toute l'étendue du front, la VICTOIRE PASSAIT"

and the second features Joffre's "Order of the Day" of 6 September 1914:

"Au moment où s'engage une bataille dont dépend le salut du pays, il importe de rappeler à tous que le moment n'est plus de regarder en arrière. Tous les efforts doivent être employés à attaquer et repousser l'ennemi. Toute troupe qui ne peut plus avancer devra coûte que coûte garder le terrain conquis et se faire tuer sur place plutôt que de reculer. Dans les circonstances actuelles, aucune défaillance ne peut être tolérée"

Other inscriptions cover the make-up of the different armies that were involved in the Allied formation and each face to the point where they were positioned at the start of the offensive. These were:

- The Army of Paris / General Gallieni
- The 6th Army of General Maunoury positioned from Betz to Meaux
- Battle place of the English Army positioned from Villiers-sur-Morin to Jouy-le-Châtel.
- The 5th Army of General Franchet d'Espèrey positioned from Provins to Sézanne
- The 9th Army of General Foch positioned from Sézanne to the camp at Mailly
- The 4th Army of General de Langle de Cary positioned from the camp at Mailly to Sermaize
- The 3rd Army of General Sarrail positioned from Revigny to Verdun.
- British expeditionary Force Commander-in-Chief Field Marshal Sir J.D.P. French.

Below each of these are listed the different Corps involved.

There is one final inscription which strikes a philosophical note:

A tous ceux qui sur notre terre du plus lointain des âges dressèrent la borne contre l'envahisseur

During the occupation from 1940 to 1944, the Germans left the monument untouched. The local people call it the "Carrot".

At the top of the monument a Celtic harp faces east and the winged statue of Victory flies from east to west through thunder, lightning and battle trumpets with the words:

"The VICTORY of the MARNE"

==== Some images from Mondemont ====
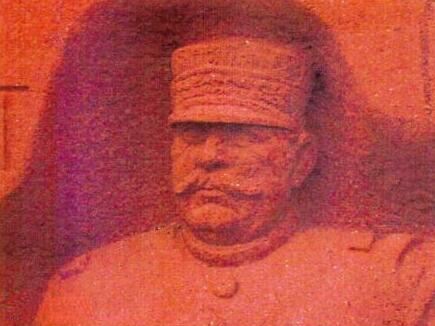
The head of Joffre carved into the Mondement column.

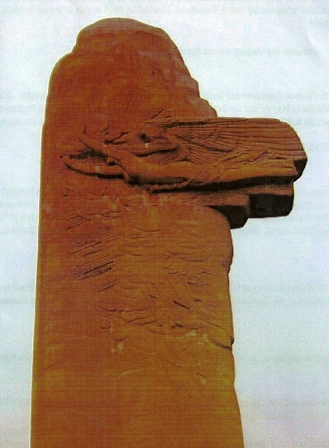
Top of the column with Bouchard's "Victory Angel"

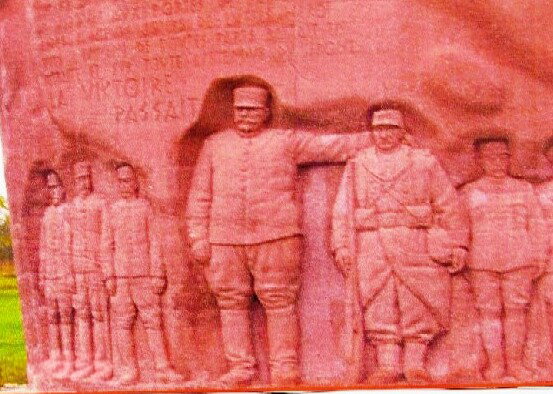
Joffre with French soldier surrounded by his Generals as carved at the base of the Mondemont memorial.

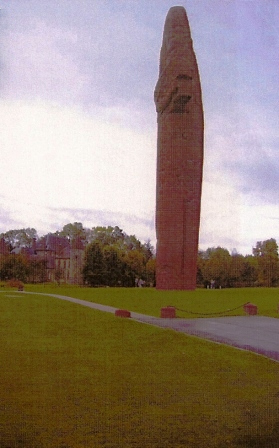
The column at Mondemont.

=== Memorial to the Battles of the Marne at Dormans ===
Memorial to the Battles of the Marne at Dormans
The memorial at Dormans commemorates both Battles of the Marne. The memorial lies in the wooded park belonging to the Chateau of Dormans. There is a chapel, a crypt and an ossuary. The stained glass windows in the chapel are the work of the Chartres firm of Lorin and the sculptures are by Firmin-Marcelin Michelet (1875–1951).

Next to the chapel is a covered area and on the walls are recorded the names of the various regiments that were involved in both battles, and relief carvings of Joseph Joffre and Ferdinand Foch, Allied Army leaders of the 1914 and 1918 battles, respectively. Their achievements are recorded, stressing the significance of the battles.

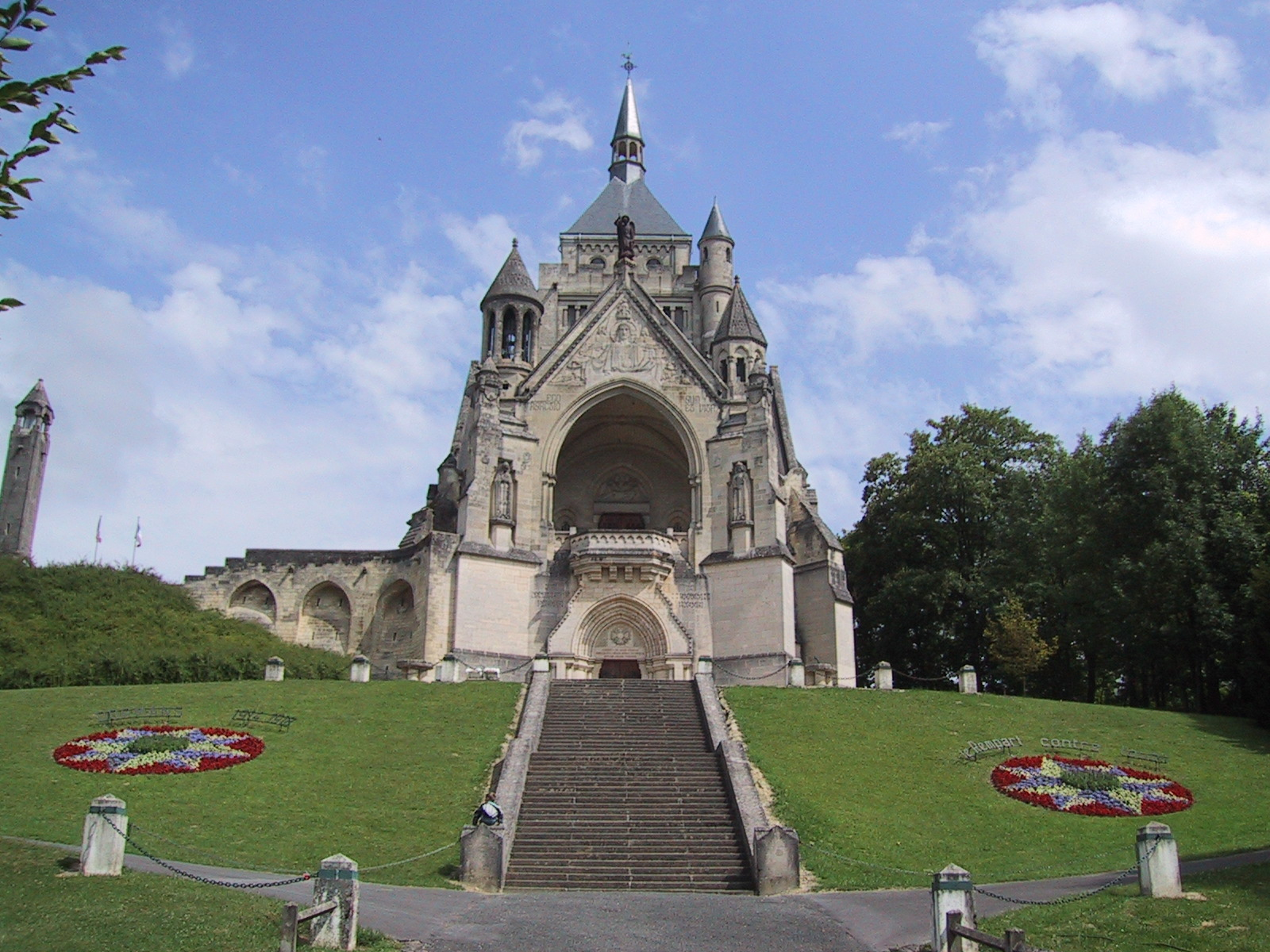
Memorial Chapel and Lantern at Dormans

=== Memorial to the Second Battle of the Marne at the Butte de Chalmont ===
Memorial to the Second Battle of the Marne at the Butte de Chalmont
Dedicated to the victory at the Second Battle of the Marne, the national memorial at the Butte de Chalmont was inaugurated on 21 July 1935 by President Lebrun. It is the work of sculptor Paul Landowski and is considered to be one of the most striking monuments on the Western Front. The memorial is on the east face of the hill (butte), which was part of the plateau from which the Allies launched their counter-attack.

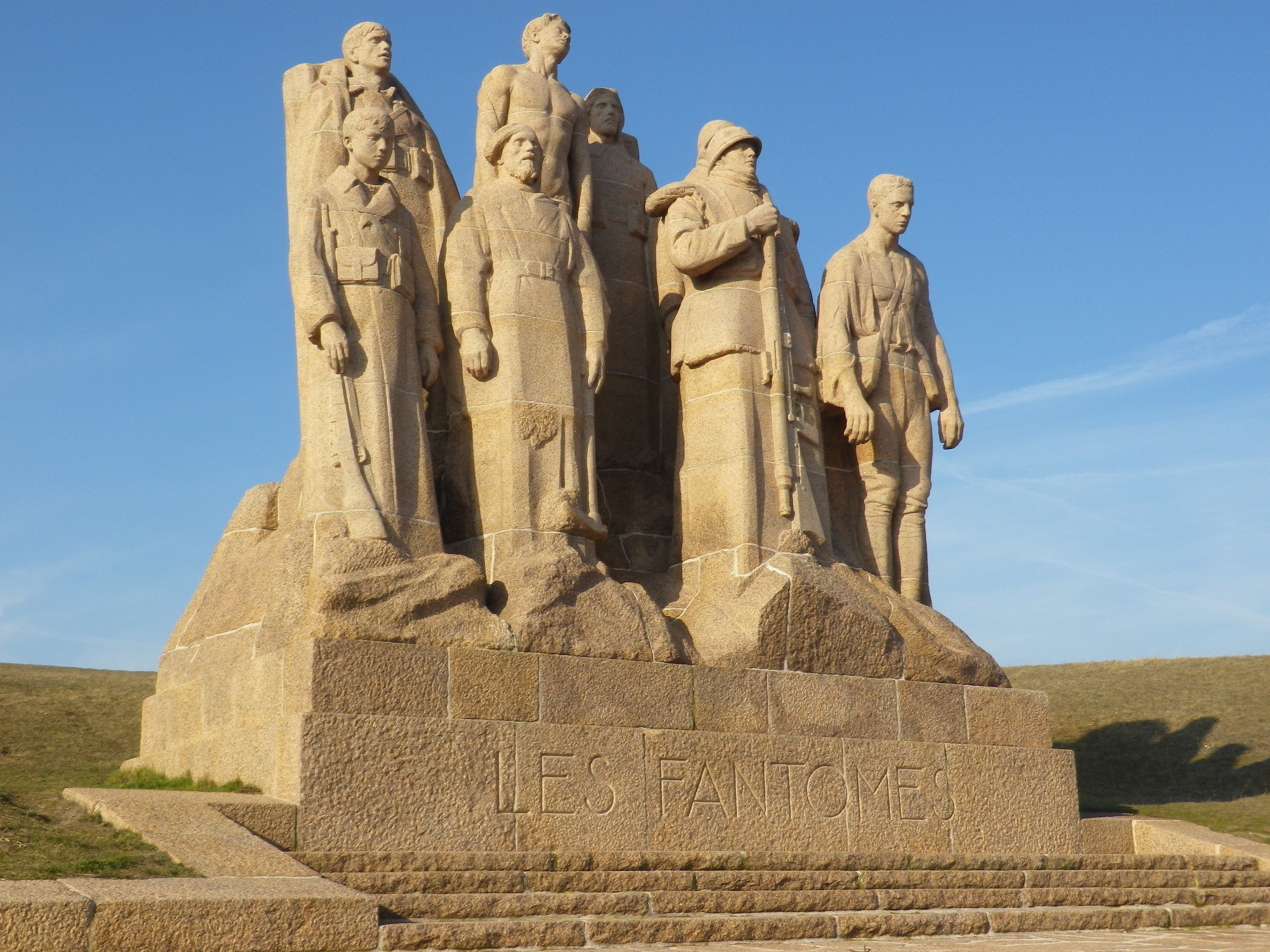
Les Fantomes, Oulchy-le-Château (Aisne, France), 1935

On the lower slope of the hill is a sculpture of a woman in a simple cloak carrying a shield on her left arm; she represents France and is walking forward and looking to the east. Behind her, are four long steps, representing the four years of the 1914–1918 war. These lead some 150 yards up the slope to the sculpture les fantômes. Its eight figures represent a young recruit, an engineer, a machine-gunner, a grenadier, a colonial soldier, an infantryman and a pilot, surrounding death who is leaving his shroud. The figures have their eyes closed; they are seeking their missing comrades.

To the left and right of the memorial are two carved stone tablets. That on the left records the events of the battle and that on the right lists the Allied Generals who took part in the battle under Commander in Chief of the Allied Armies, Ferdinand Foch.

The stone tablet on the left reads

"Le 15 juillet 1918, l'ennemi engage la bataille en Champagne contre les IVème, Vème et VIème armées – Le 17, ses efforts sont brisés de Château-Thierry à l'Argonne. À l'aube du 18 juillet, entre Nouvron et la Marne, les Xème et Vème armées s'élancent à l'assaut sur le flanc de l'ennemi, atteignent le soir le front Pernant-Torcy, progressent sans arrêt les jours suivants et enlèvent la butte de Chalmont (25 et 26 juillet), succès décisif qui repousse l'ennemi sur les plateaux du tardenois. Il tente en vain de résister au nord de l'Ourcq – combats du Grand-Rozoy – il est rejeté sur la Vesle. Soissons est délivré, 30.000 prisonniers et un matériel considérable sont capturés. Le front est raccourci de 50 km, la voie Paris-Chalons rétablie, la menace contre Paris levée. Après trois semaines de durs combats, auxquels participèrent des divisions américaines, britanniques et italiennes, la seconde bataille de la Marne se terminait victorieusement. L'initiative des opérations passait aux mains des alliés"

== Memorials to the Missing ==
These battles involved the deaths of many men and there are two major British "Memorials to the Missing" for the men lost whose remains could not be identified. The memorials at La Ferté-sous-Jouarre links to the First Battle of the Marne, and that at Soissons which links to the 1918 battle.

== Monuments in Reims and the surrounding area ==
Reims was a front-line city throughout the four years of the war and suffered bombardment from German artillery. The Reims Cathedral was bombed and damaged on many occasions, and images of it became a rallying icon in the non-German world. Sixty per cent of Reims was destroyed during the 1914–1918 war, and 4,567 Reims men were killed in the conflict, with a further 740 civilian casualties.

=== The monument aux morts in Reims ===
The monument aux morts in Reims

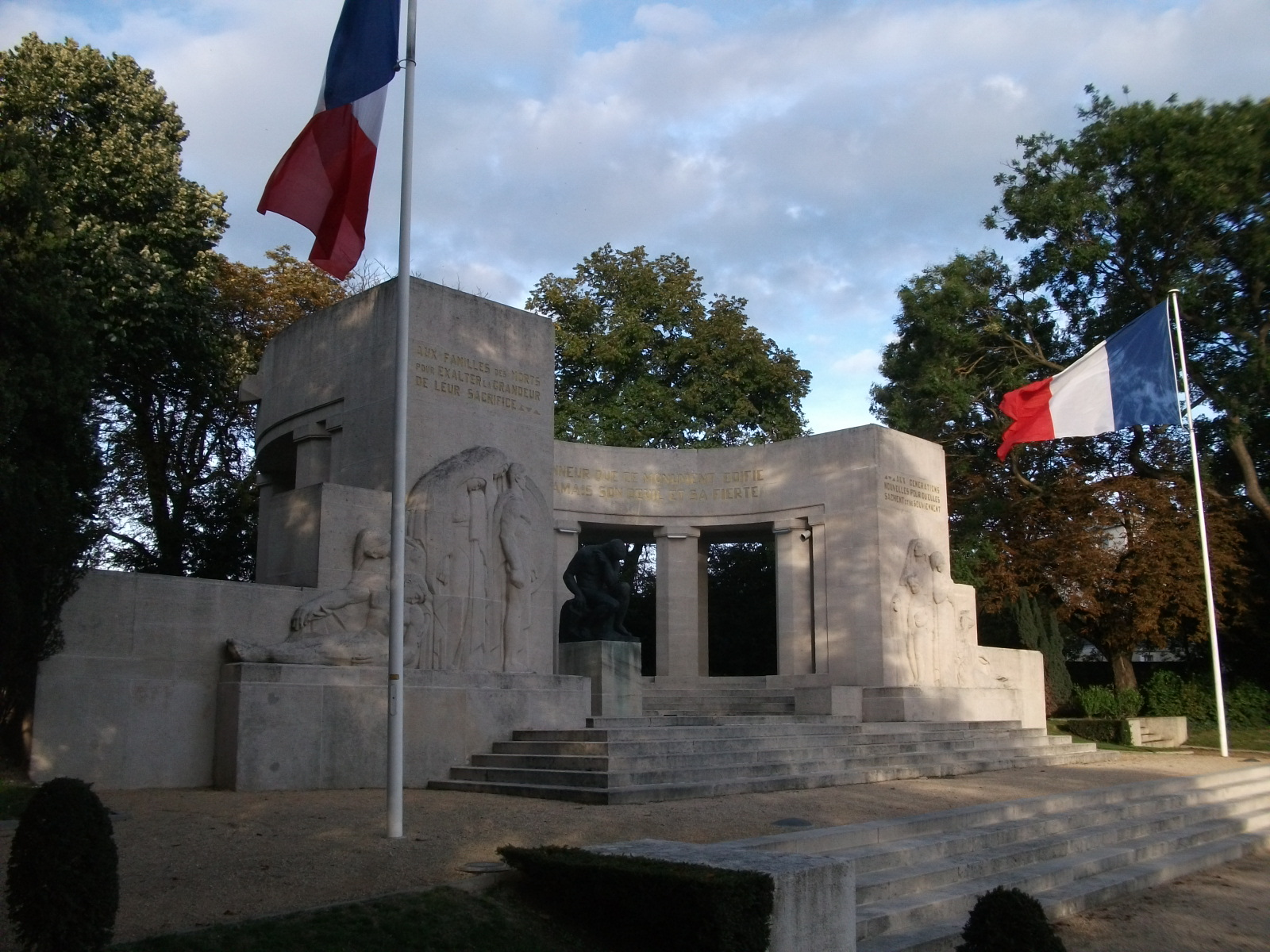
Reims War Memorial in the Place de la République

The war memorial in Reims is located in the Place de la République. The architect was Henri Royer with sculptural work by Paul Lefèbvre. It was inaugurated in 1930 by Philippe Pétain and the Minister of War André Maginot. The central statue in bronze shows a youth deep in thought.

"Pensée accomplissant son effort de résurrection"

There are reliefs on either side of this central figure. The relief on the left is entitled "1914 le sacrifice" and is dedicated to the families of the dead ("Aux familles des morts pour exalter la grandeur de leur sacrifice.") while that on the right bears the legend "1918 la leçon du passé" and speaks to future generations reminding them not to forget the sacrifices of their parents ("Aux generations nouvelles pour qu'elles sachent et se souviennent"). A list of the names of the dead was sealed up with one of the memorial's bricks and there is a book in the Reims town hall which also contains this information.

Along the top is the inscription:

"Enfants de Reims tombes au champ d'honneur que ce monument edifie par votre ville meurtrie exprime à jamais son deuil et sa fierte"

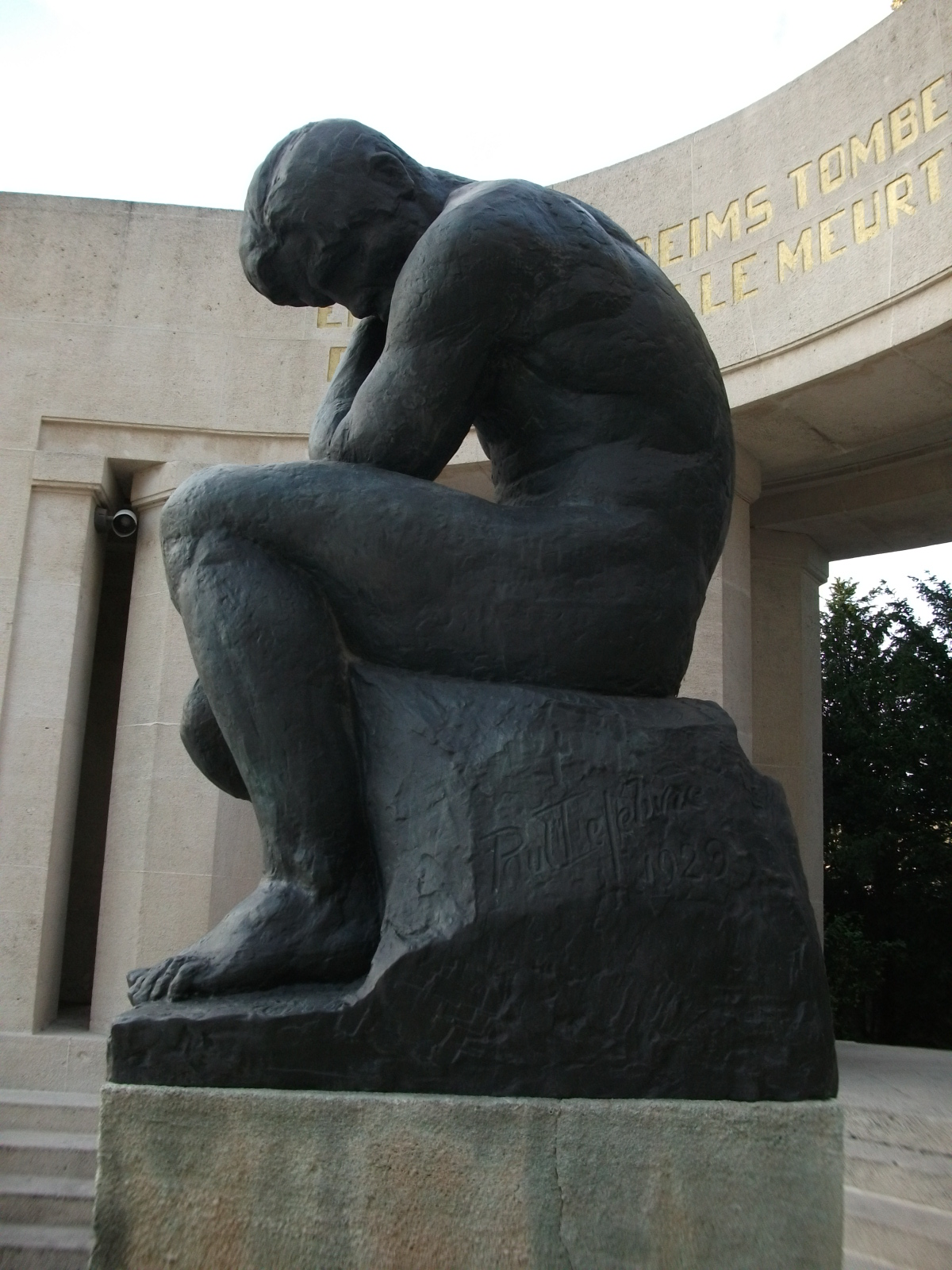
The statue at the centre of the Reims monument aux morts. A youth is deep in thought.

=== The Monument aux infirmières de Reims ===
The Monument aux infirmières de Reims
Reims is the location of a monument dedicated to nurses from France and overseas who lost their lives serving in the war. The monument "à la gloire des infirmières françaises et alliées victimes de leur dévouement" was financed by international subscriptions organised by a committee founded and run by Juliette Adam. The architect was Charles Girault and the sculptural work is by Denys Puech. The inauguration took place on 11 November 1924, and amongst those assembled for the ceremony were Cardinal Luçon (the Archbishop of Reims), Pastor Gonin, Rabbi Hermann and General Pau.

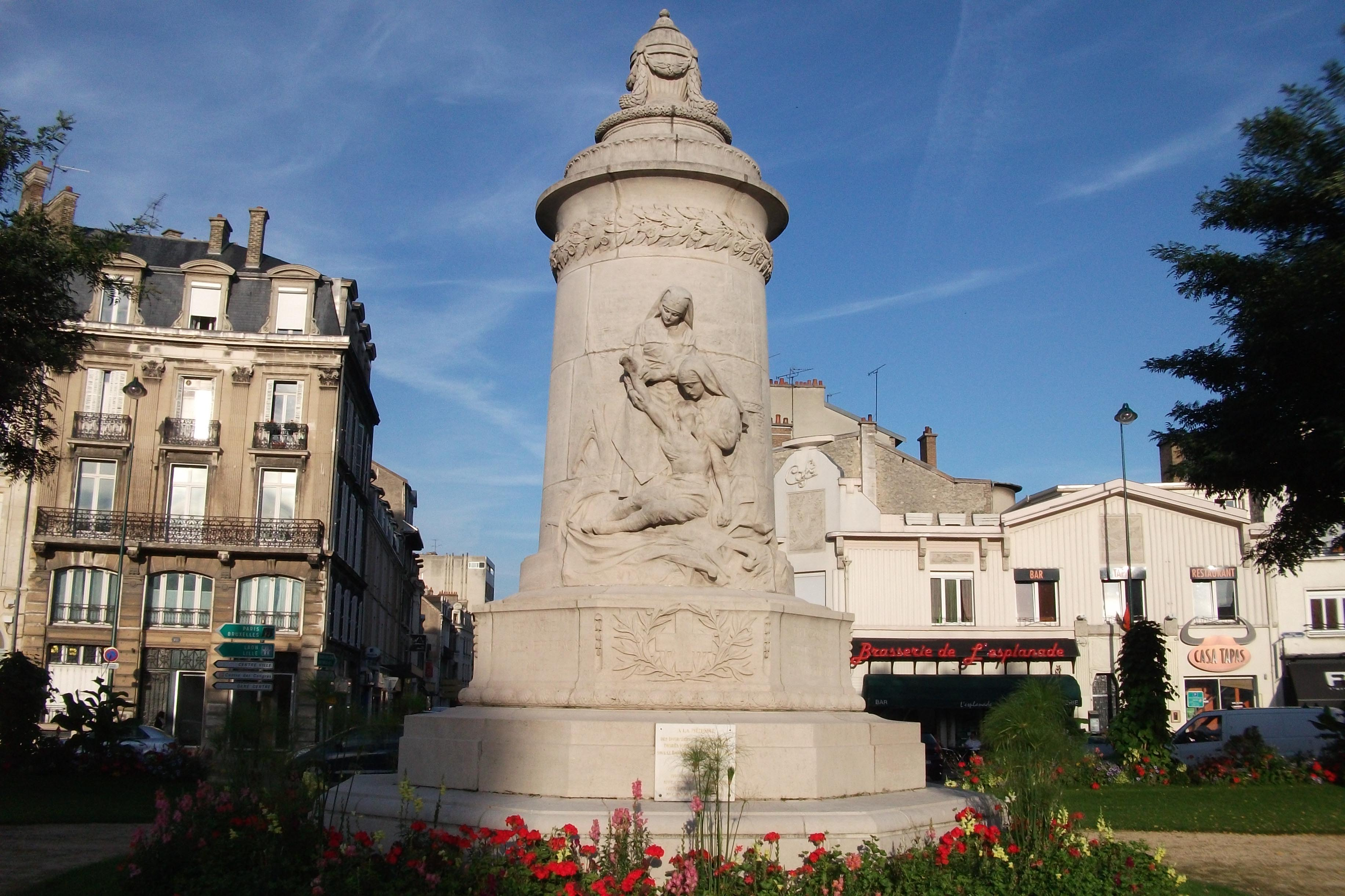
Monument in Reims dedicated to the nurses both French and from overseas who served in the Great War and lost their lives while nursing

=== Monument to the 132nd and 332nd French Infantry Regiments plus the 46th Territorials ===
Monument to the 132nd and 332nd French Infantry Regiments plus the 46th Territorials
The monument to the 132nd and 332nd French Infantry Regiment plus the 46th Territorials features a sculpture of a French soldier (poilu). It was part of the scheme to reconstruct Reims after the war, initiated by the architects Hippolyte Portevin and Max Sainsaulieu. The actual monument was the design of the architect Émile Fanjat and was funded by subscriptions raised by the veterans of the 132nd in particular, to honour the men who were killed fighting in Les Éparges between 23 October 1914 and 12 April 1915. The inscription on the monument reads

Aux morts des 132e et 332e Régiments d'infanterie et du 46e Régiment territorial d'infanterie

The soldier on the top of the monument is the work of Paul Lefèbvre who worked on the Reims monument aux morts.

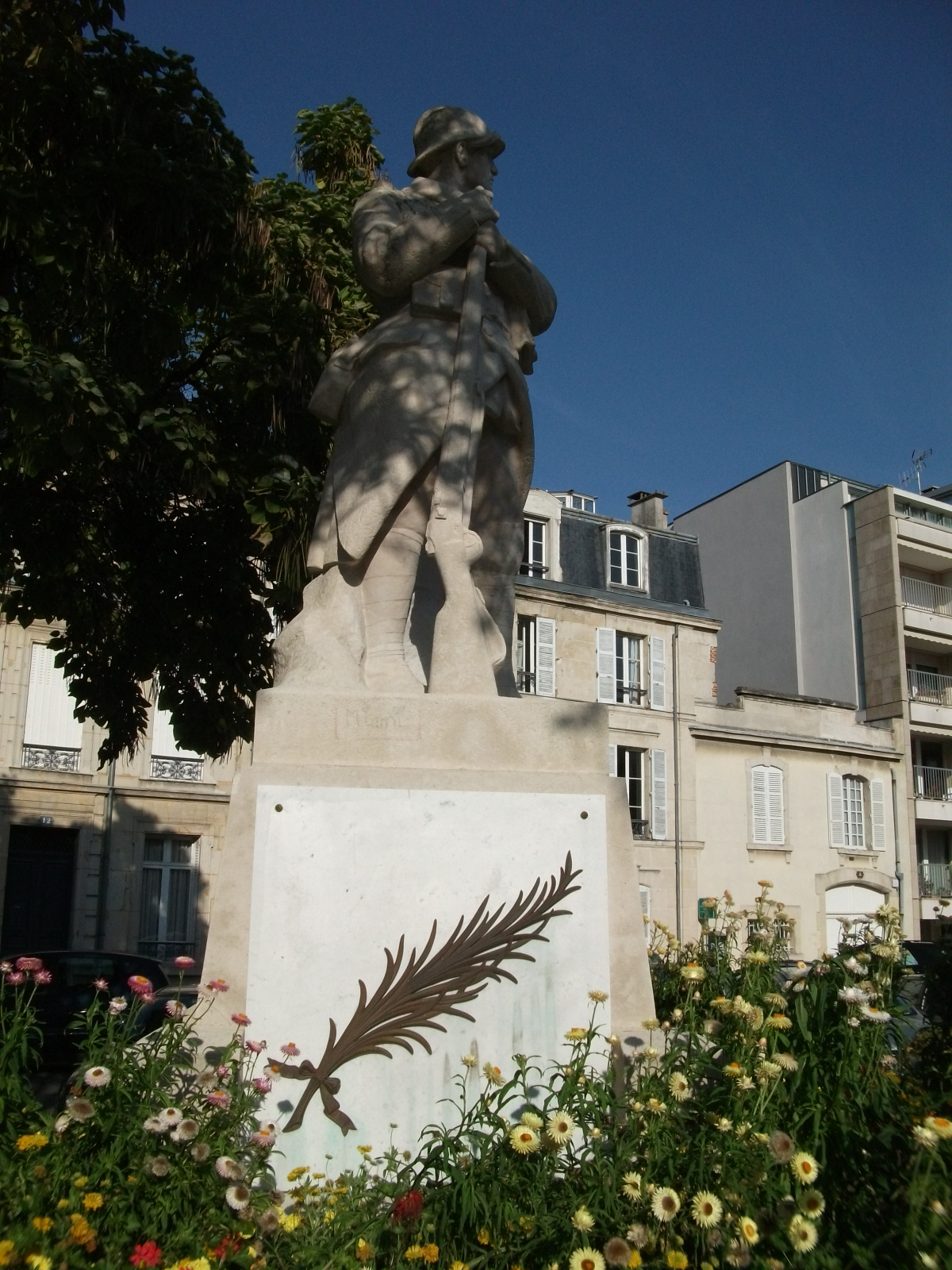
Monument to the 132nd French Infantry Regiment in Reims.

=== Monuments to the 24th, 28th, 133rd and 363rd French Infantry Regiments at Loivre ===
Monuments to the 24th, 28th, 133rd and 363th French Infantry Regiments at Loivre

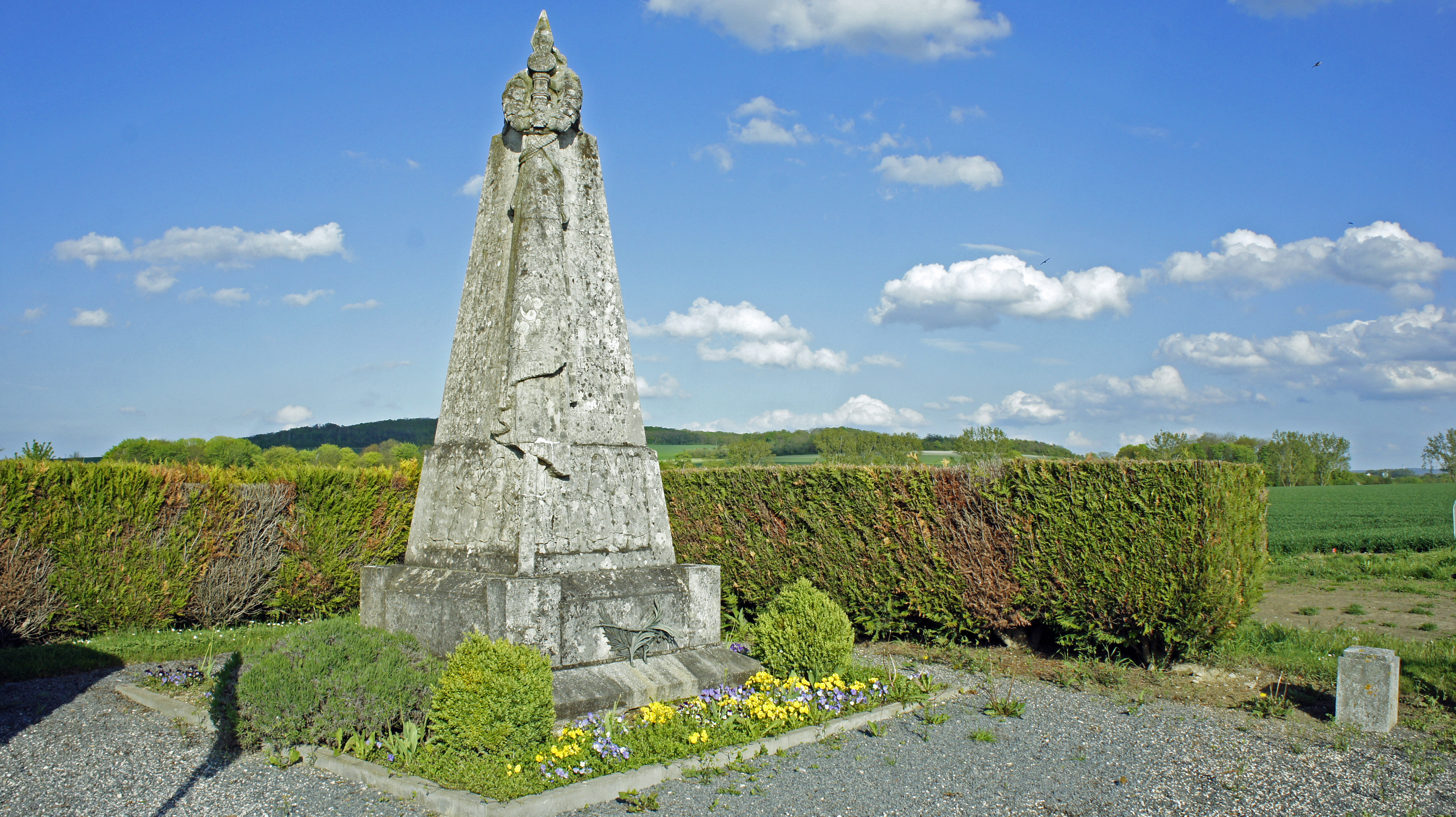
Monument to the 363rd French Infantry Regiment

At Loivre, to the north of Reims, there are several regimental monuments. That shown here was dedicated to the 363rd and was unveiled on 24 August 1930. The sculptor was Antoine Sartorio who had served with the 363rd himself. The monument lists the 363rd's battle honours: Vosges, Somme, Aisne, Alsace, Argonne and Champagne. The monument to the 24th, 28th and 133rd was inaugurated on 14 October 1923. This monument has deteriorated over the years, and a number of the inscriptions are now no longer legible.

=== The German Cemetery at Loivre ===
The German cemetery at Loivre contains the remains of 4,149 men of whom 1,913 could not be identified and their remains are in an ossuary.

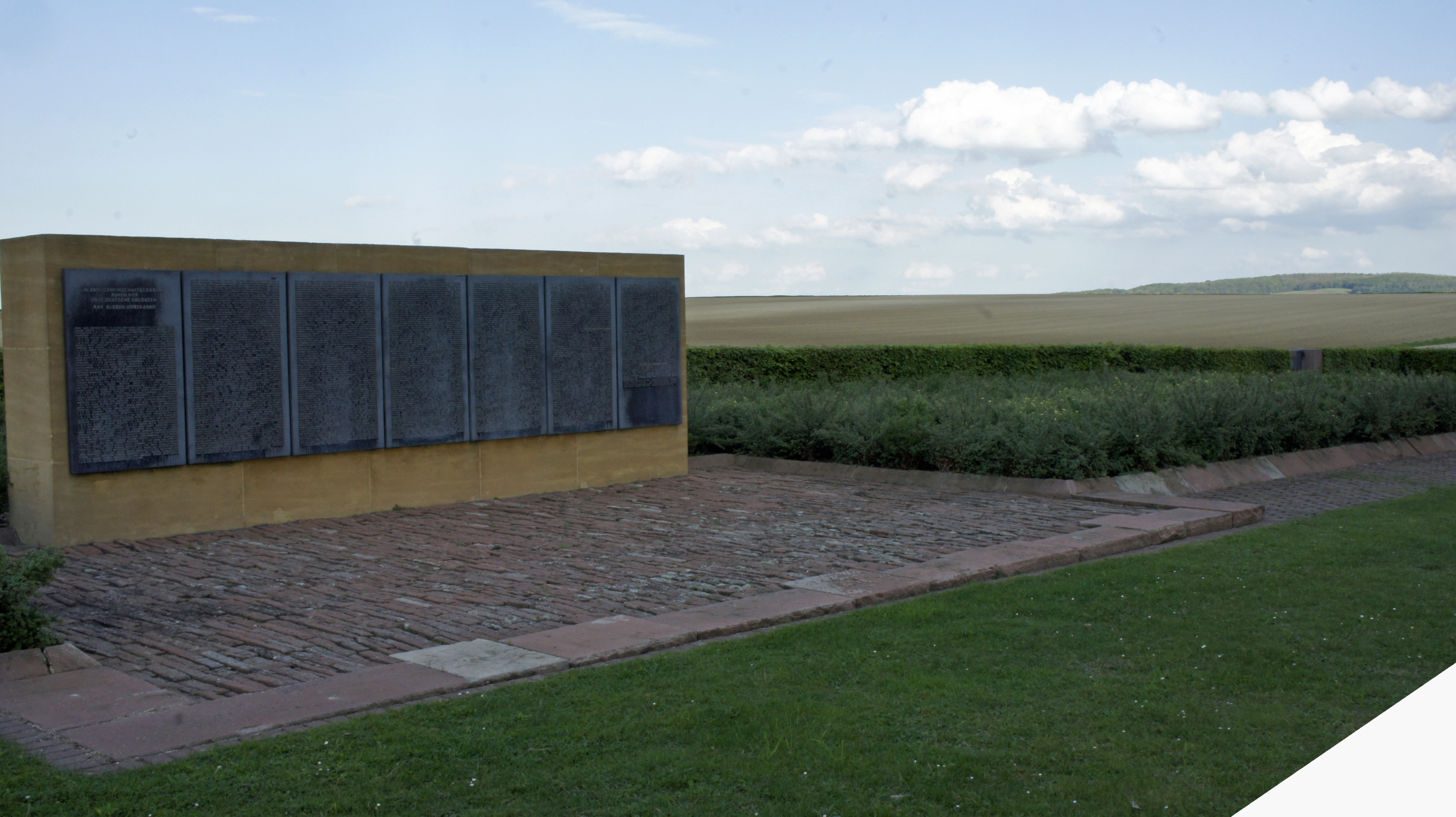
German ossuary at Loivre. Plaques bear the names of those whose remains are in the ossuary

=== The Monument to the 119th and 319th French Infantry Regiments and the 20th Territorials at Cauroy-lès-Hermonville ===
This monument is located at Cauroy-lès-Hermonville near Reims. Many men of the 119th had fallen in the Battle of Charleroi on 22 August 1914, one of the battles fought at the beginning of the war and known as the Battles of the Frontiers. One inscription is from Belgium and pays homage to the men of the 119th (aux frères – their brothers in arms)

== British cemetery at Hermonville ==
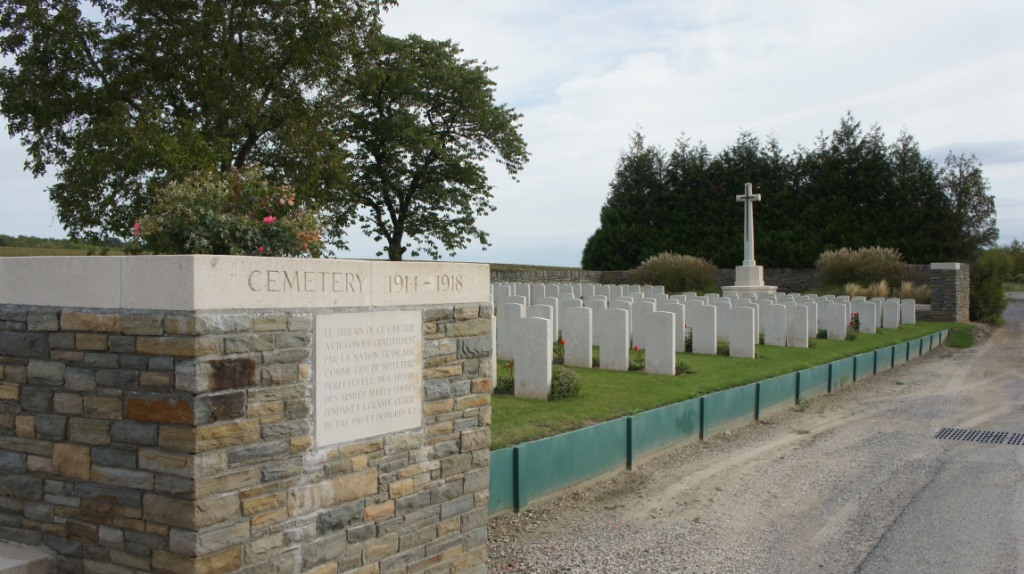
Cemetery.

== Miscellaneous ==
=== The monument to the 11th Company of the 72nd Infantry Regiment ===
The monument to the 11th Company of the 72nd Infantry Regiment
This monument is located at La Buisson, to the east of Vitry-le-François. It carries a quotation from Victor Hugo: "Ceux qui pieusement sont morts pour la patrie ont droit qu'à leur cercueil la foule vienne et prie."

The inscription refers to the fighting which took place on 6 September 1914.

=== Bridge to the 28th Infantry Division (US) ===
28th Infantry Division

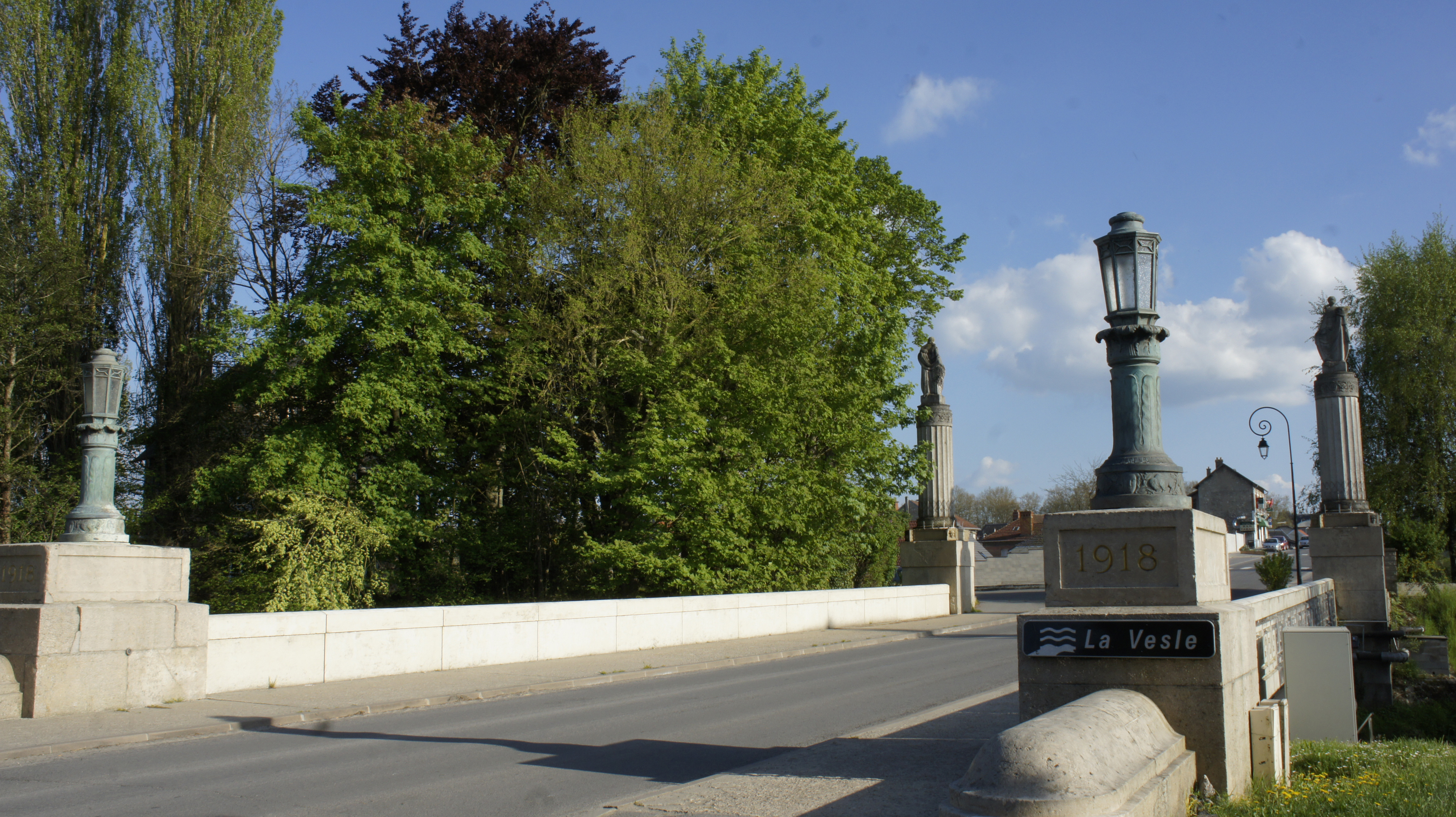
from the north

This monument is located at Fismes, to the west of Rheims on the Vesle river. It was erected by the state of Pennsylvania to commemorate the service of the U.S. 28th Infantry Division, which built a bridge at the location. An inscription reads: Reaffirming the friendship between Fismes and Meadville.

=== Italian Cemetery at Bligny and the Italian volunteers who fought in France 1914–1915 ===
The Italian Cemetery at Bligny
Many Italians living in France joined the French army as volunteers, and on 5 November 1914, part of the Foreign Legion took the name "Régiment des Garibaldian" (after Giuseppe Garibaldi). These units were dissolved in 1915 when Italy officially joined the war, but in 1918 Italy sent 41,000 soldiers to fight in Champagne and the Chemin des Dames. From April to November 1918 they lost more than 9,000 men, many of whom are buried in the Bligny cemetery. Opposite the cemetery a "Roman Way" was established, lined with cypress trees and leading to a symbolic broken column.

=== Memorial to the 1st Loyal North Lancs at Vendresse, Troyon ===
Memorial to the 1st Loyal North Lancs at Vendresse, Troyon
The 1st Battalion Loyal North Lancashire Regiment were part of 2nd Brigade, 1st Division, and commanded by Lieutenant Colonel G.C. Knight. The battalion's first action was alongside the 2nd Royal Sussex of the same Brigade, at Priez on 10 September 1914, when Lieutenant Colonel Knight was mortally wounded. Following the charge of 4th Dragoon Guards, the battalion crossed the Aisne at Bourg on 13 September and advanced towards the Chemin des Dames, halting at Vendresse. From here the battalion attacked Troyon on 14 September 1914, under the command of (Acting Lieutenant Colonel) Major W.R. LLoyd. In this action, the unit suffered heavy casualties, with nine officers being killed, five wounded and 500 other ranks killed or wounded. Among the dead was Lt-Col Lloyd, the second commanding officer to be killed since arrival in France.

The survivors dug in on the slopes of the Chemin des Dames and held these positions until relieved by 1st East Yorks on 19 September 1914. The 1st Loyals remained on the Aisne until mid-October, when they were moved north to take part in the fighting in Flanders. They lost their third commanding officer, Major A.J. Carter DSO, at Ypres in November 1914.

On the crest of the ridge at Troyon, the regiment erected a memorial to their dead. The inscription on it reads:

In memory of the Officers, Warrant and non-commissioned Officers and men of the 1st Battalion of the Loyal North Lancashire Regiment who laid down their lives on active service 1914–1919

Files held at the National Archives in Kew, covering the years 1919 to 1923, offer further background information on this memorial. C.T. Atkinson, who served on the committee whose approval was needed for memorials to be erected and to approve where they were to be located, wrote:

The 1st Loyal North Lancashire formed part in September 1914 of the 2nd Brigade, First Division commanded by Brigadier General Bulfin which acted as the advance-guard of Sir Douglas Haig's First Corps in the battle of 14 September 1914. The battalion, together with the whole of the 2nd Brigade, distinguished itself greatly by its attack on the portion of the Chemin des Dames, north of Vendress, Troyon and the services of the Brigade were warmly acknowledged both in the Divisional reports and in the published dispatches. There would be ample justification of the erection of a monument by the 1st Loyal North Lancashires at this spot...

=== Cemeteries in Soupir ===
Cemeteries in Soupir

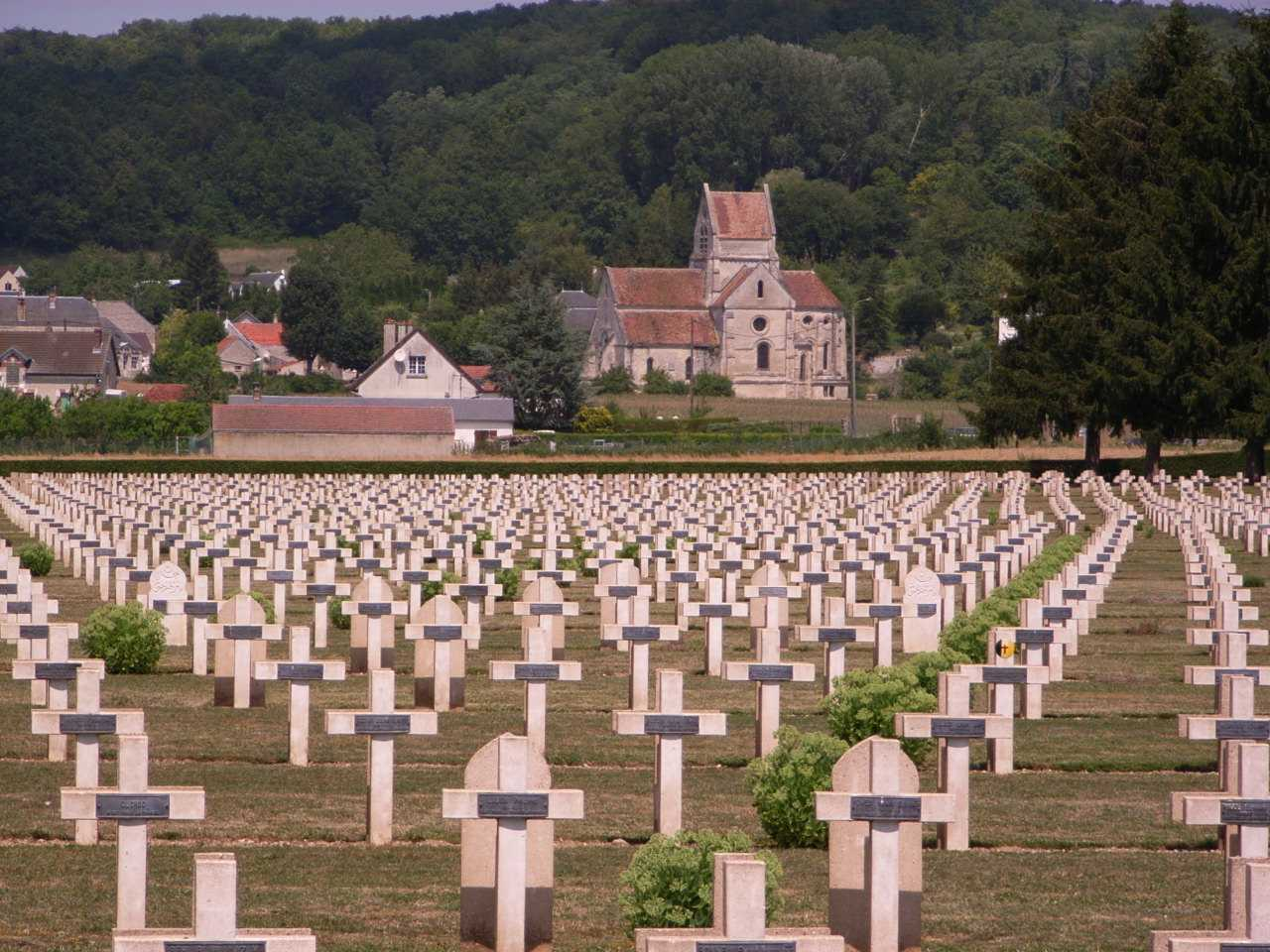
French Cemetery at Soupir

Located south of the Chemin des Dames, the village of Soupir was largely destroyed during the Second Battle of the Aisne. Five national cemeteries are now located in Soupir: two French, one German, one British and one Italian. The two French cemeteries are Soupir French Military Cemetery No. 1 and Soupir French Military Cemetery No. 2 and the German cemetery joins onto Soupir French Military Cemetery No. 2. There are 11,089 German soldiers buried there. 5,134 have their own graves (19 of them unknown soldiers – unbekannt ) while a further 5,995 are buried in the mass grave in the centre of the cemetery.

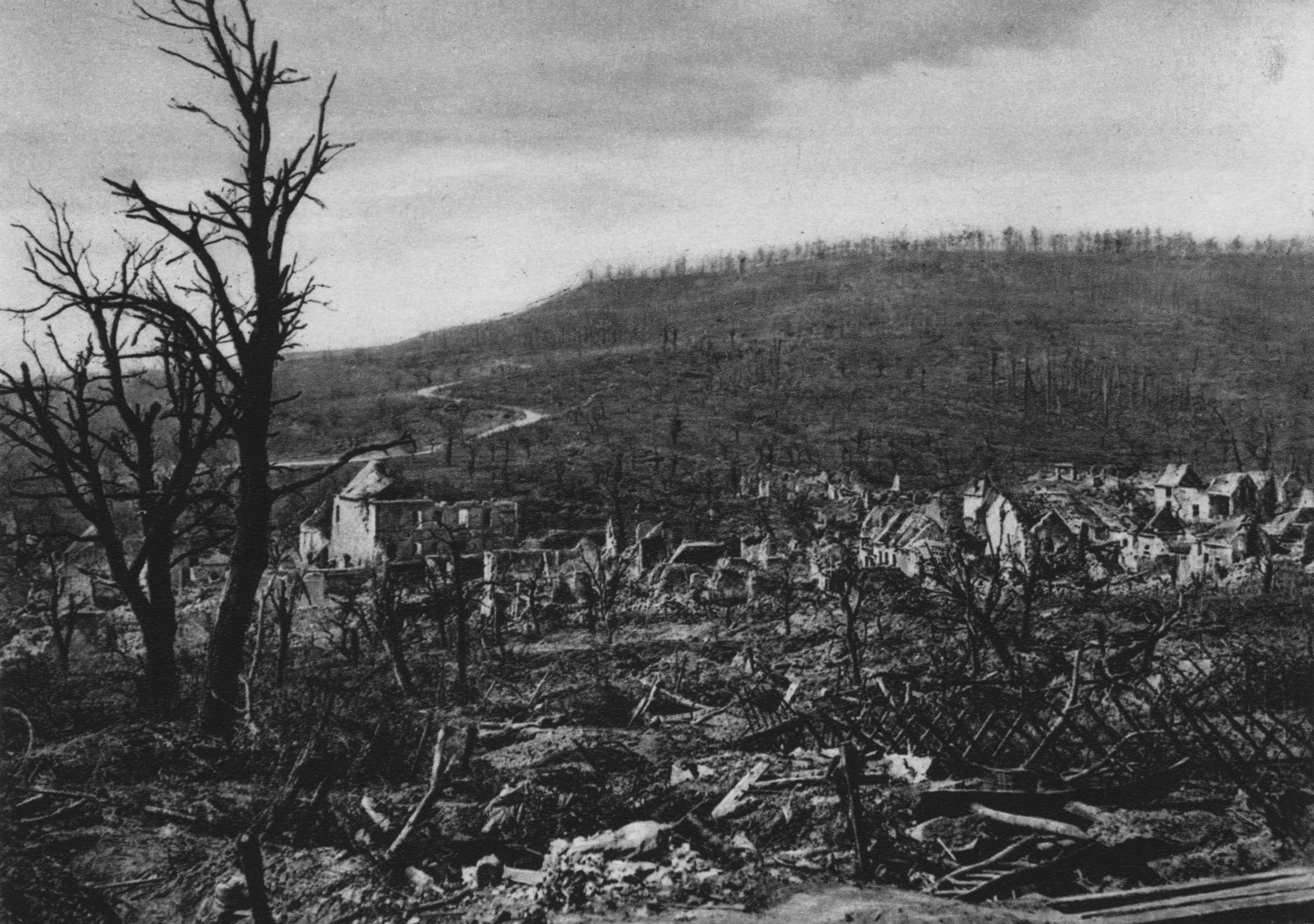
Total devastation of Soupir in 1917

=== The Italian Cemetery at Soupir ===
The Italian Cemetery at Soupir
This cemetery sits on the western outskirts of Soupir village on the D 925, between Vailly-sur-Aisne and Bourg-et-Comin. This area is known as Mont Sapin and was the subject of fierce fighting throughout the war. The 2nd Italian Army Corps arrived in France on 25 April 1918, as a sign of mutual aid from the Italian Government. Under the command of General Albricci, the Corps consisted of the 3rd and 8th Italian Divisions. They were initially positioned alongside French Divisions near Verdun in order to acclimatise themselves to conditions on the Western Front. Four months later, on 15 July 1918, the Germans attacked when the 2nd Battle of the Marne opened.

The Germans struck either side of Reims, in what was to be their last offensive of the war. The attack on the eastern side of Reims against General Gouraud's First Army came to a grinding halt on its first day. The western prong against Degoutte's Sixth Army made better progress and established some semblance of a breakthrough. Reinforcements from the French Ninth Army plus British, American, and the two Italian Divisions were all used to shore up the front. The German offensive was brought to a halt and then pushed back. On 20 July 1918, the Germans ordered a retreat and by 3 August 1918 they were back at their initial positions. Following their participation in this success, the 2nd Italian Corps was positioned on the river Aisne, just south of Soupir below the Chemin des Dames, on 22 September 1918. On 1 October, they took Soupir and spent the remainder of the month fighting along the Chemin des Dames as the Germans were slowly pushed north.

During the course of the war, the 2nd Italian Corps lost 4,375 killed and 10,000 wounded. The cemetery at Soupir contains the bodies of 593 Italian soldiers, the majority of whom fell in fighting along the Chemin des Dames. From April to November 1918, the 2nd Italian Army Corps, made up of the 3rd and 8th Divisions (The Brescia and Alpi Infantry Brigades), fought in the Reims sector between Vrigny and Jaulgonne in the Ardennes sector, and in the Aisne to the east of Soissons, fighting under the 5th, 10th and the 3rd French Armies. The Italian forces commanded by General Alberico Albricci suffered more than 9,000 soldiers killed during its victorious campaigns. 592 of them rest in this Military Cemetery created and maintained by the Italian Ministry of Defence. The entrance to the cemetery at Soupir in shown here.

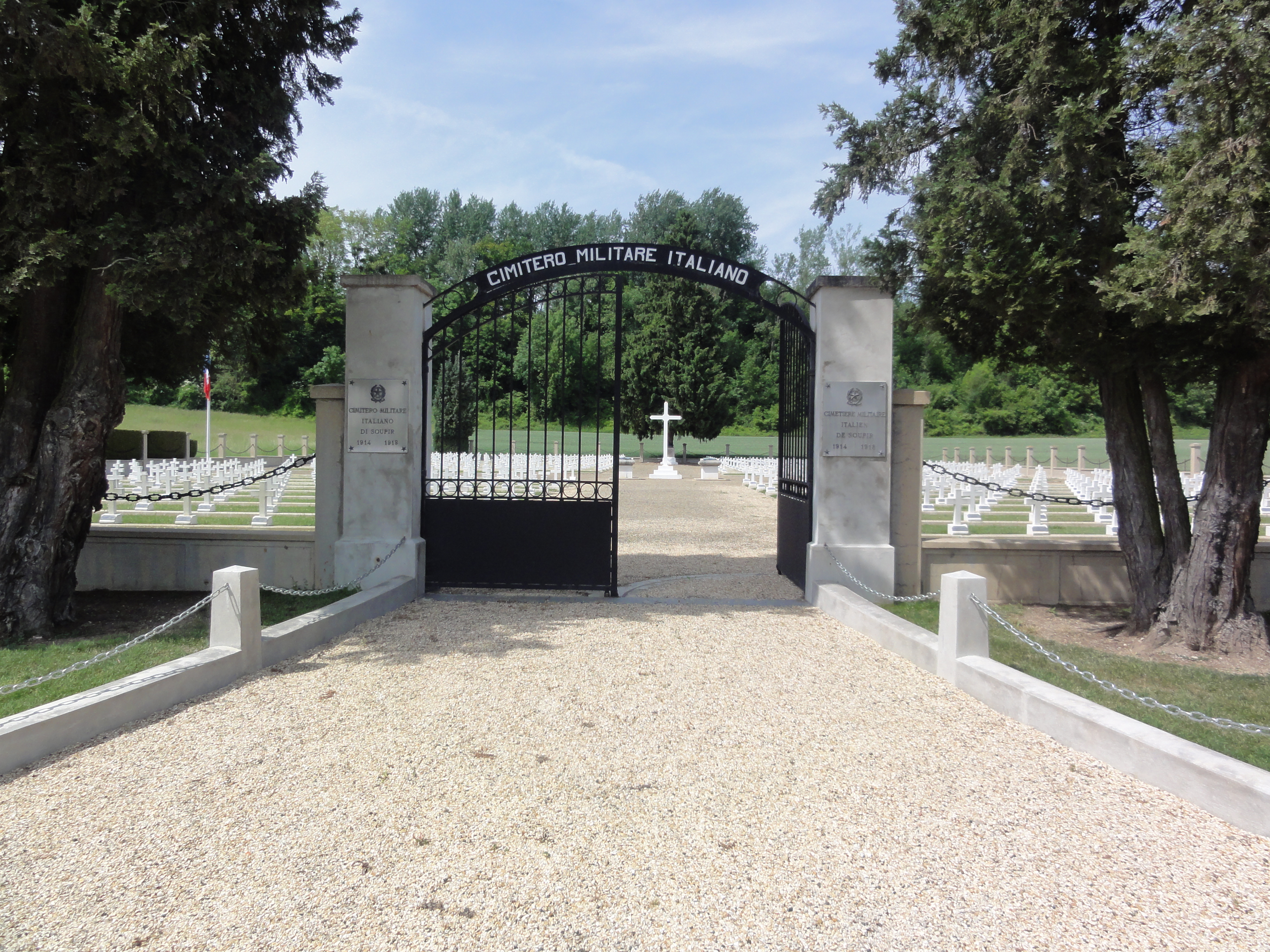
The Italian Cemetery at Soupir

=== The Monument to the United States First Division at Buzancy ===
The Monument to the United States First Division at Buzancy
This memorial commemorates the part played by the United States 1st Division at Soissons at the end of the Second Battle of the Marne. An obelisk is surmounted by an American eagle whose wings protectively envelop the 1st Division's crest. A bronze plaque recounts how the 1st Division advanced 11 kilometres (6.8 mi) into the German lines taking the village of Berzy-le-Sec and arriving just in front of Buzancy. The Division lost 2,213 men killed and 6,347 wounded from 18 to 21 July 1918, before being relieved by the 15th (Scottish) Division. The memorial to the Scots can be found in the nearby Buzancy Military Cemetery.

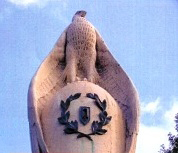
Memorial at Buzancy

== The area to the east of Reims ==
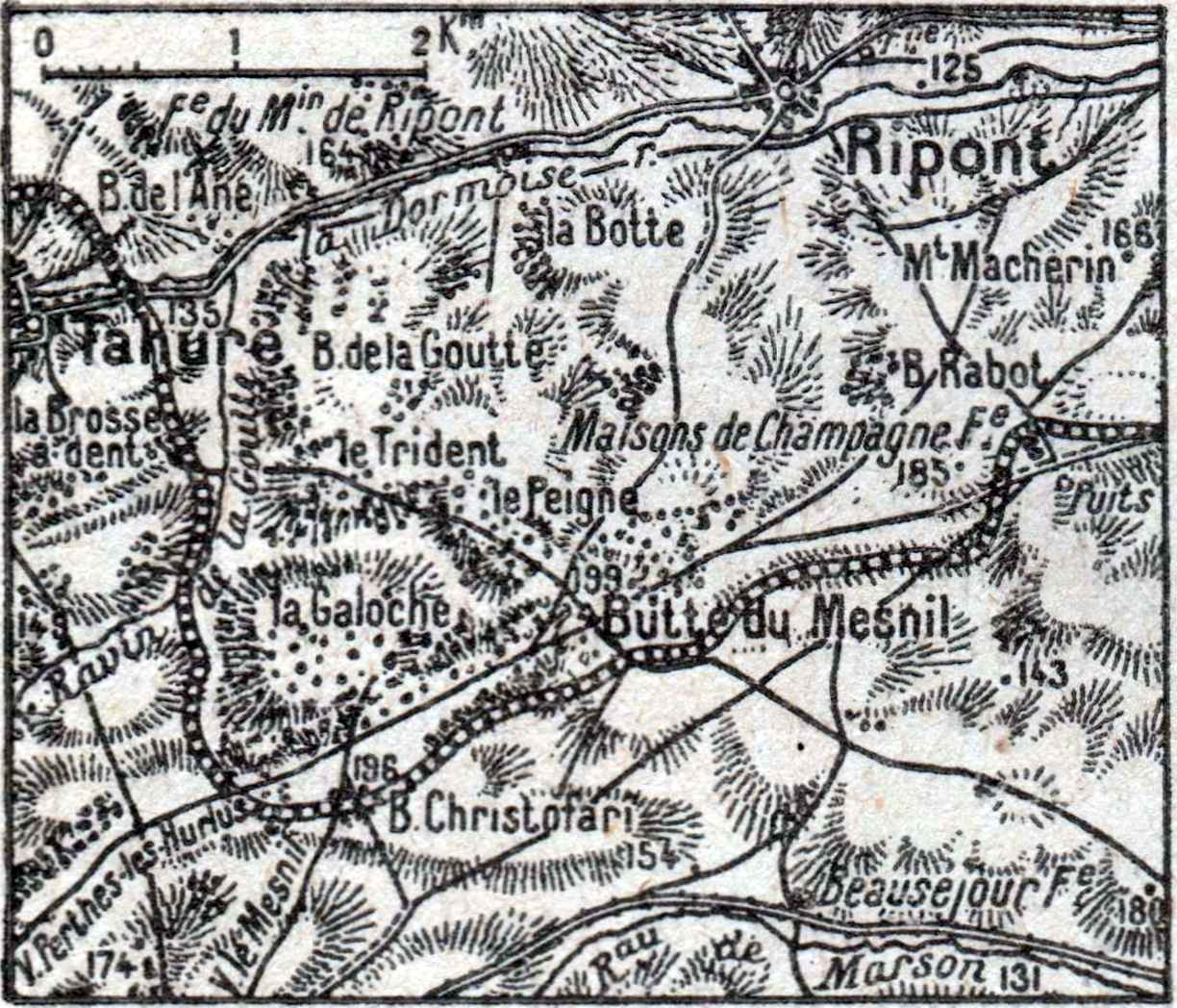
German salient between Tahure and the Butte du Mesnil.

The area to the east of Reims
The area between Reims and the Forest of Argonne – 30 by 4 kilometres (19 by 2 mi) – saw fierce fighting over the four years of war. 103 different French Divisions were engaged along with 4 American Divisions and 2 Russian Brigades, as well as Polish and Czechoslovak units. Seven villages in the area were so badly damaged that they were never rebuilt.

In the present French military camp of Moronvilliers, there is a small chapel commemorating the destroyed villages of Nauroy and Moronvilliers. Erected in 1920 and positioned on the site of Nauroy, the chapel has been restored by "L'Amicale des Diables bleus d'Épernay".

Five ruined villages lie in the camps at Moronvillers, Mourmelon and Suippes, and the French Army allows public access in September of every second year, organising tours known as "La Journée des Villages Détruits".

At Souhain there is a monument and ossuary dedicated to the French Foreign Legion.

=== The monument aux morts at Sillery ===
The monument aux morts at Sillery
The monument aux morts at Sillery, inaugurated in 1925, features a sculpture by Édouard Sediey. It is composed of a distraught woman before a cross inscribed with the names of the dead and the words: "Sillery à ses morts glorieux 1914–18".

Near this memorial is another dedicated to the martyrs of the Resistance. It is a Cross of Lorraine (a symbol of French patriotism) upon which are carved the faces of three of those deported by the Germans and the names of 8 people who died while deported.

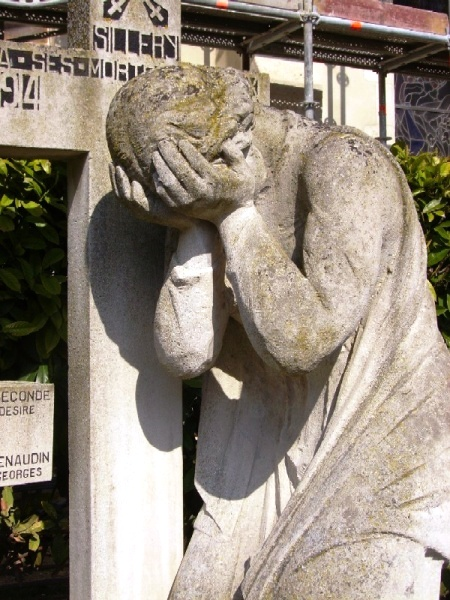
Monument aux morts at Sillery

=== Military cemeteries at Aubérive ===
Military cemeteries at Aubérive
The French Military Cemetery at Aubérive holds the remains of 6,424 French soldiers. 2,908 could not be properly identified and their remains were placed in three ossuaries.

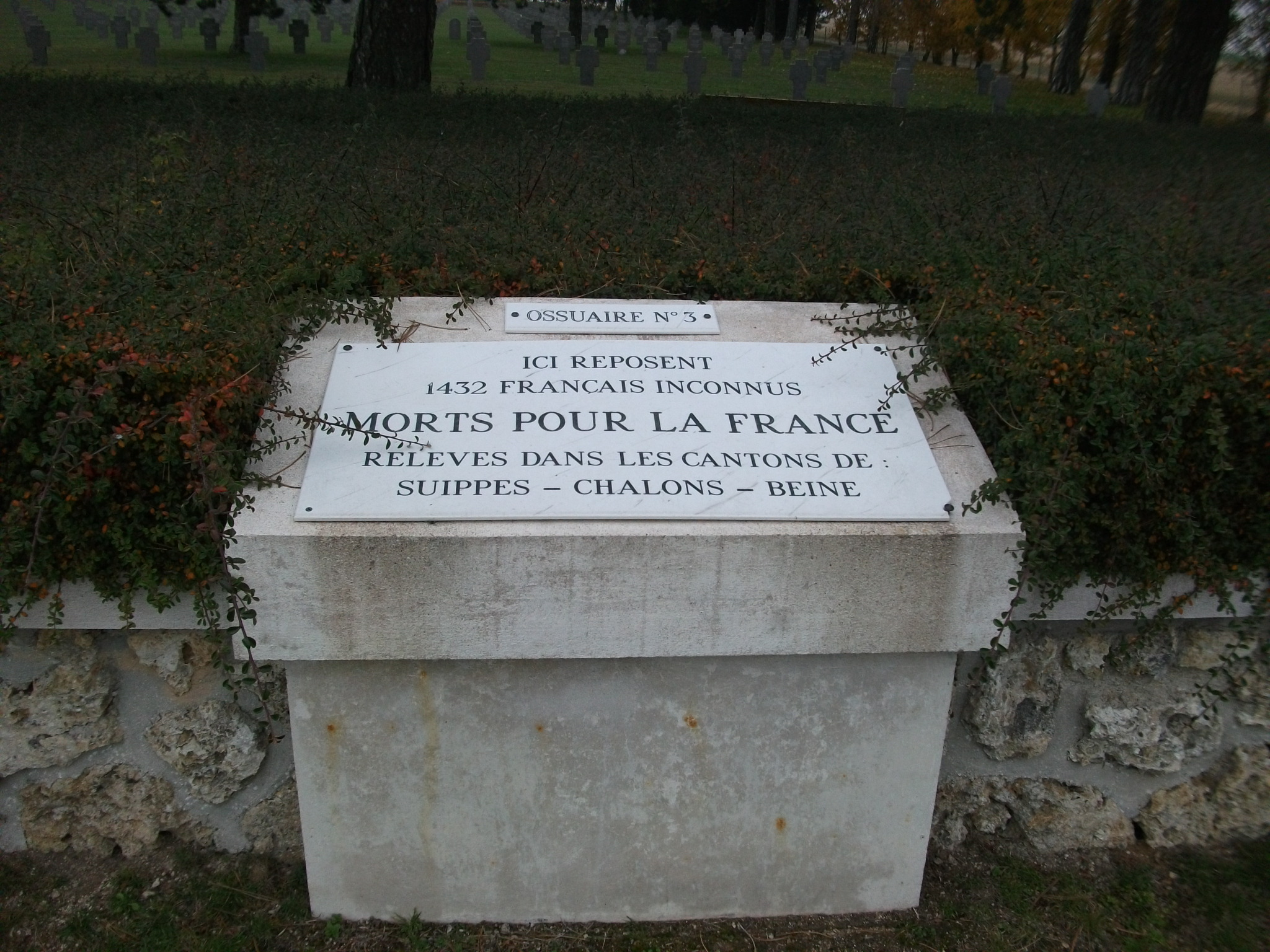
Ossuary at Aubérive

The Polish cemetery at Aubérive is situated southeast of Reims and is a part of the French cemetery at Le Bois du Puits. It contains the graves of 129 Polish soldiers killed in World War I (and 256 killed in World War II). Many of these volunteered for the French Foreign Legion. At the cemetery is a memorial to these 129 men, composed of an obelisk surmounted by a cross. There is also a monument to the 1st and 2nd divisions of Polish Infantry, formed in 1917 and known as the Blue Army.

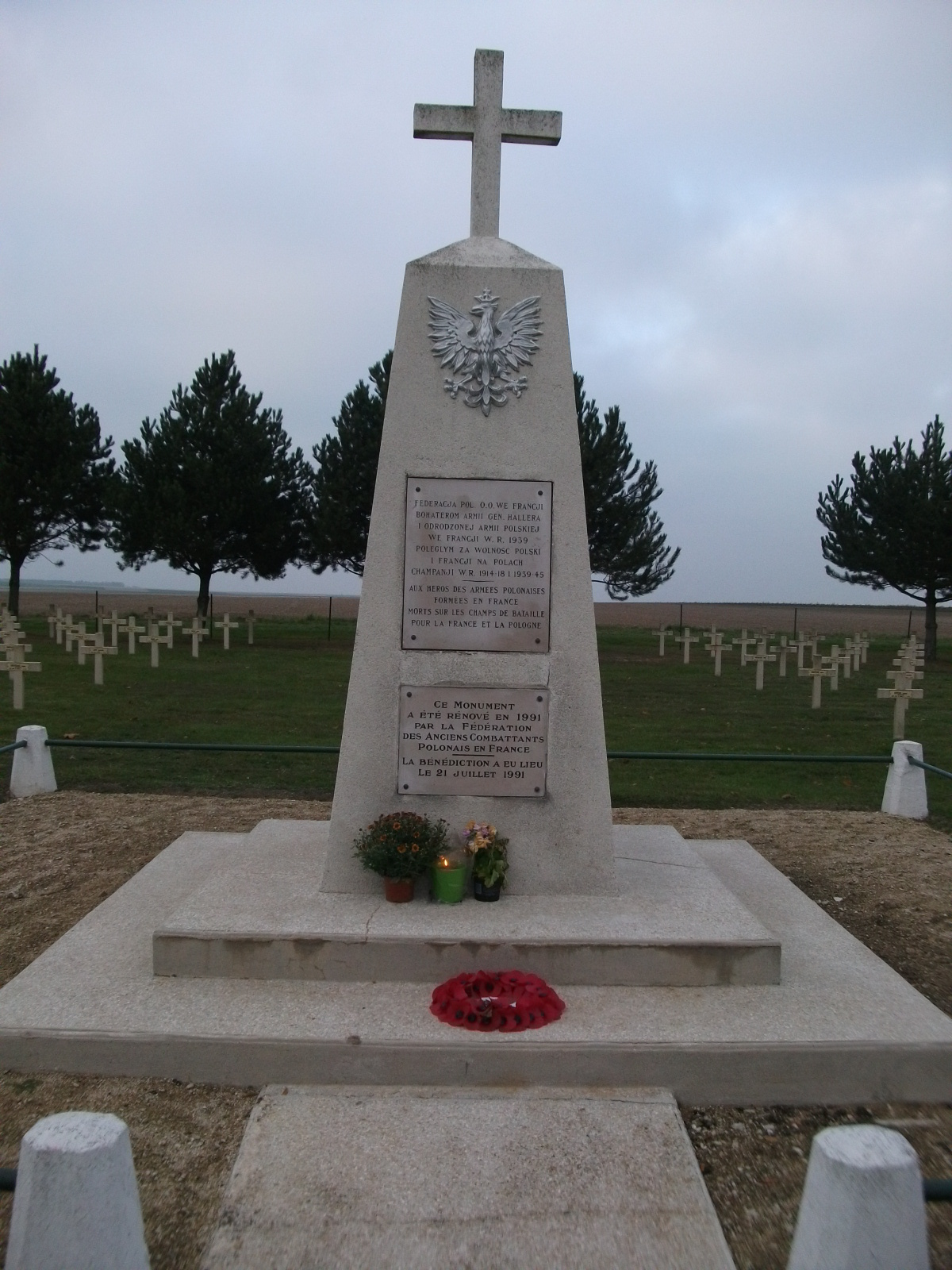
The Polish monument in the Bois du Puits cemetery

The German cemetery at Aubérive lies to the rear of the French cemetery at Le Bois du Puits. 5,359 German soldiers were buried here; 3,124 could not be identified and their bodies were laid in an ossuary. Many of the soldiers were Thüringian.

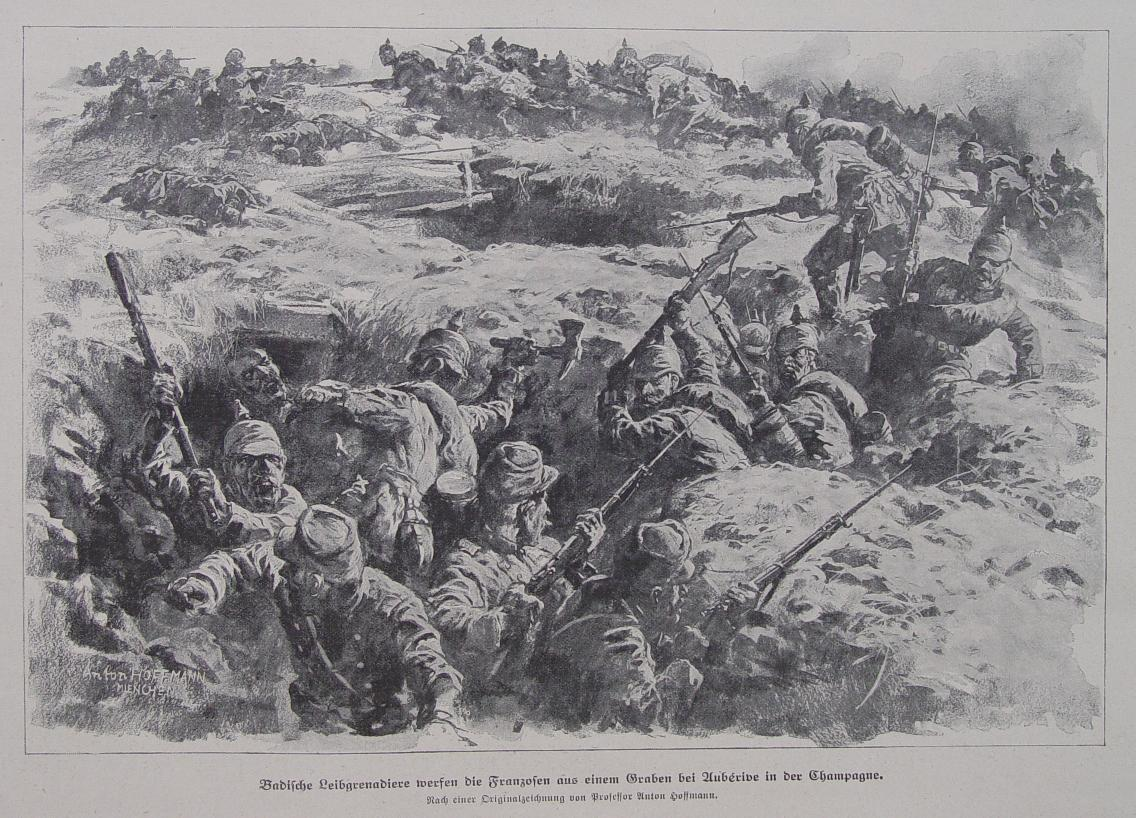
French and Germans fighting in an Aubérive trench.

=== Monument to the 103rd French Infantry Regiment ===
Monument to the 103rd French Infantry Regiment
This memorial was erected by the French veterans organisation "Souvenir français" and is located in the village of Aubérive. The inscriptions include:

Aux Héros du 103e RI qui sont tombés glorieusement pour la france en Septembre–Octobre 1915

In memoriam Guerre 1914–18 103ème Régiment d'infanterie 80 officiers 7,000 sous-officiers et soldats morts pour la France.

There is also the monument Borne No. 77, one of the series created by Paul Moreau-Vauthier to mark the furthest points of German advance along the Western Front. Those bornes (stone markers) in France were made from pink granite from Andlau in Alsace. This borne bears the inscription: "Ici fut repoussé l'envahisseur Juillet 1918", corresponding to the liberation of Château-Thierry.

=== Memorial remembering the "Eugène" trench and the Monument to the 8th Army Corps ===
Memorial remembering the "Eugène" trench
The memorial to the "Eugène" trench, funded by Souvenir Français, and the 8th Army monument are located in the Val-de-Vesle, east of Reims in the direction of Sainte-Ménehould. The memorial is dedicated to those soldiers who were killed in the area in the offensives of April 1917. Nearby are Vauthier Bornes 36 and 37. The inscription does not mince words:

Ici le 17 avril 1917 au trente-troisième mois d'une guerre impitoyable des soldats français sont tombés par milliers pour la reprise des Monts de Champagne. Eux aussi, ils aimaient la vie. Ils ont souffert et ils sont morts dans l'espoir que leur sacrifice assurerait la paix entre les hommes-PASSANT N'OUBLIE PAS

Visitors are entreated to not forget the dead (translation): "They too loved life and gave their lives to ensure that there would be peace between all men! Passersby do not forget this!"

=== The Fort de la Pompelle and the defence of Reims ===
The Fort de la Pompelle and the defence of Reims
Souvenir Français organised this memorial at the Alger farm, 4 kilometres (2 mi) from Reims, where fighting took place to defend the Fort de la Pompelle. On it is inscribed "Aux héros de la Grande Guerre" (To the heroes of the Great War). The monument was restored in 1998 on the 80th anniversary of the armistice, and carries the inscription:

En mémoire des soldats tombés héroïquement pour la défense du secteur Septembre 1914 – Octobre 1918

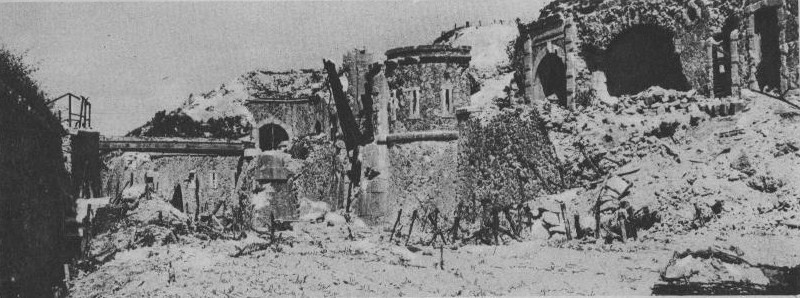
Photograph showing the damage done to the Fort de la Pompelle after constant bombardment

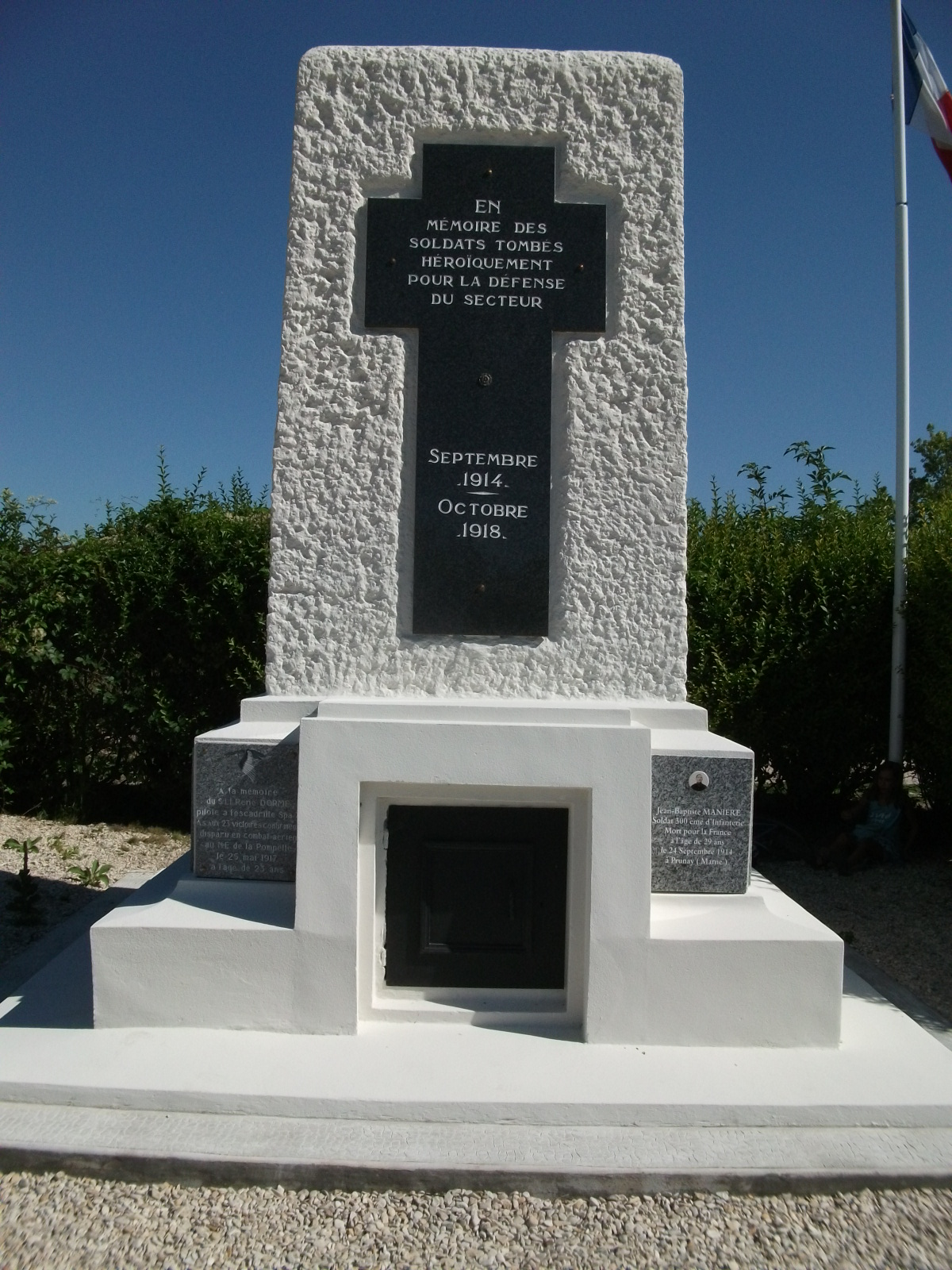
Monument in memory of the soldiers who were killed defending the Fort de la Pompelle

=== Monument to the African Soldiers who died 1914–1918 ===
Monument to the African Soldiers who died 1914–1918
This monument stands at the junction of the Boulevard Giroud and the Rue Vasquier on the eastern side of Reims. The original monument was erected in July 1924, and was a copy of a monument in Bamako, capital of the French Sudan (now Mali). These twin monuments celebrated the memory of the indigenous African soldiers who had given their lives in the service of France. At the 29 October 1922 groundbreaking, André Maginot recalled the bravery of Sergeant Amadou Di'ale of the 34th Bataillon of Senegalese Tirailleurs; and at the 13 July 1924 inauguration, General Archinard mentioned in particular the contribution made by the 1st Corps of the Colonial Army in holding the Fort de la Pompelle against German attack that threatened Reims.

The monument itself was the work of two Parisiens: sculptor Paul Moreau-Vauthier and architect Auguste Bluysen. It comprised a pedestal 4 metres (13 ft) in height upon which were carved the names of the principal battles in which African troops participated. On top of the pedestal was a 3-metre (10 ft) bronze sculpture depicting a group of four soldiers of the colonial armies gathered around a white officer holding the French National flag.

During WWII, German occupiers pulled the monument down and took it from Reims in a railway wagon, possibly to melt down the bronze for armaments. With the end of the Algerian war, thoughts turned to building a replacement and a competition was organised to choose a design. On 6 October 1963, the new monument was unveiled by Minister of War Pierre Messmer. It is modern in design and two columns in limestone represent the union of African and French soldiers and the block upon which these columns stand was intended to represent Reims' resistance in WWI.

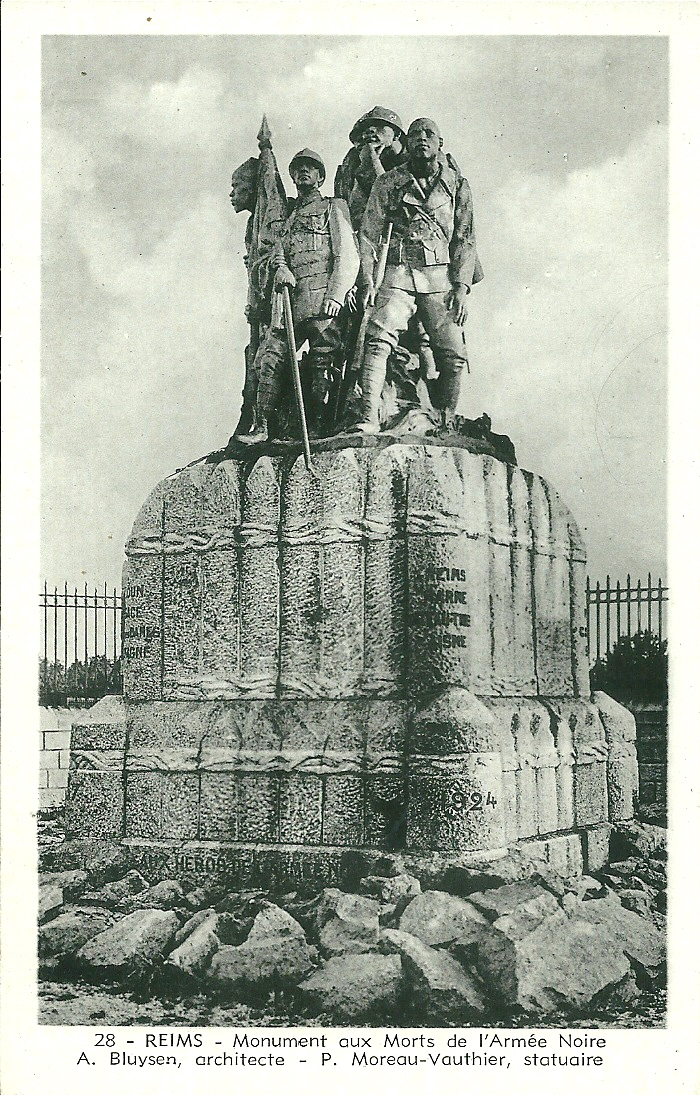
The old Reims memorial to Black Soldiers

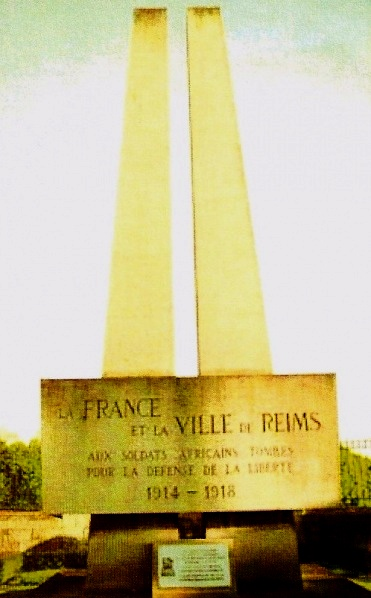
The new memorial in Reims to African soldiers who fought for France in 1914–1918

=== The Blanc Mont American Memorial at Sommepy-Tahure ===
The Blanc Mont American Memorial at Sommepy Tahure
The Sommepy Monument stands on the crest of Blanc Mont ridge, to the north of Sommepy-Tahure, and celebrates the 70,000 US soldiers who fought alongside the French in the Champagne region. Dedicated in 1937, it bears the insignias of the 93rd, 36th, 2nd and 42nd US Divisions and where they fought. The inscription reads:

Erected by the United States of America to commemorate the achievements of her soldiers and those of France who fought in this region during World War I

The monument is in the form of a tower. Visible within, through the grill in the door, is a brief summary of US operations in the area. When open to visitors, it is possible to climb to an observation platform at the top of the tower.

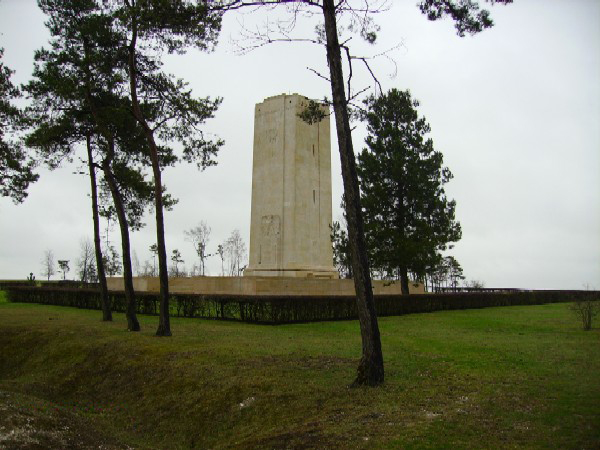
American Memorial at Sommepy Tahure

=== French Military Cemetery at Sommepy-Tahure ===
French Military Cemetery at Sommepy-Tahure

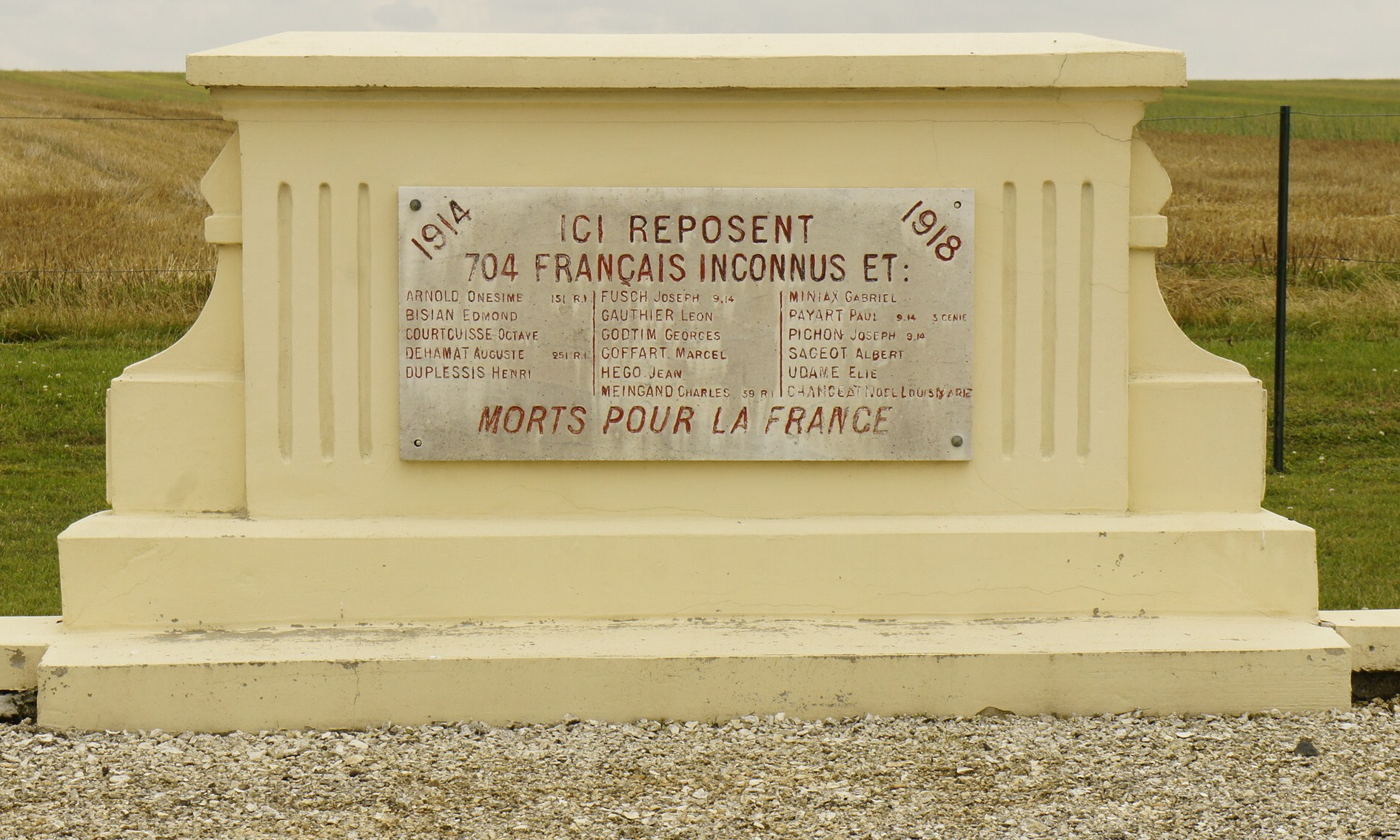
Ossuary at Sommepy-Tahure French Military Cemetery

The French Military cemetery of Sommepy-Tahure contains the remains of 2,201 French soldiers, of whom 704 lie in an ossuary shown here. The cemetery was created in 1920 for bodies exhumed in the area east of Reims.

=== Monument to the 60th French Infantry Regiment at Ville-en-Tardenois ===
Monument to the 60th French Infantry Regiment at Ville-en-Tardenois
This monument stands south-west of Reims on the RD 980, as one leaves Ville-en-Tardenois in the direction of Dormans.

The inscription reminds visitors that many men of the 60th French Infantry Regiment fell fighting in the woods of Courmont, Bonval and Cohette and the area around Ville-en-Tardenois in the attacks against the Germans from 26 July to 2 August 1918.

=== Monument to the 5th and 6th American Marines at Sommepy-Tahure ===
Monument to the 5th and 6th American Marines at Sommepy-Tahure
This monument to two regiments of the United States 2nd Division was erected at the foot of the hill on which the Church of Sommepy-Tahure stands. The inscription tells visitors that the 5th and 6th Regiments conquered the territory north of Sommepy and Blanc-Mont.

=== The German Military Cemetery at Souain-Perthes-les-Hurlus ===
The German Military Cemetery at Souain-Perthes-les-Hurlus
This cemetery lies in the area of Souain-Perthes-lès-Hurlus and is near the French Military Cemetery at "La Crouée". The cemetery holds the remains of 13,786 soldiers. 11,322 bodies could not be identified and were placed in an ossuary.

=== The Ferme de Navarin Monument ===
The monument at the farm of Navarin
Situated 45 kilometres (28 mi) east of Reims, "Le Monument aux morts des Armées de Champagne" was inaugurated in 1924 by General Gouraud, the Military Governor of Paris who commanded the 4th French army in Champagne in 1916 and from June 1917 until November 1918. The monument is privately maintained by the organisation "Monument aux morts des Armées de Champagne et Ossuaire de Navarin".

Near to the village of Souhain is a Celtic cross marking the memorial to the French 28th Infantry Brigade and also the imposing monument of the "Ferme de Navarin". It is a combined monument and ossuary, within which lie the remains of 10,000 soldiers who fell on the plains of Champagne. The monument is a pyramid-like structure surmounted by a sculpture by Maxime Real del Sarte of three soldiers. The middle figure is meant to portray Gouraud; the soldier on the right represents Quentin Roosevelt who was killed in Cambrai on 14 July 1918; and the figure on the left represents del Sarte's brother who was killed in Champagne. At the base of the monument are listed the numerous divisions who fought in Champagne.

Among the 10,000 soldiers in the crypt are the four sons of Paul Doumer. When General Gouraud died in 1946, he had asked to be buried with his men in the "Ferme de Navarin" and his tomb has pride of place in the crypt.

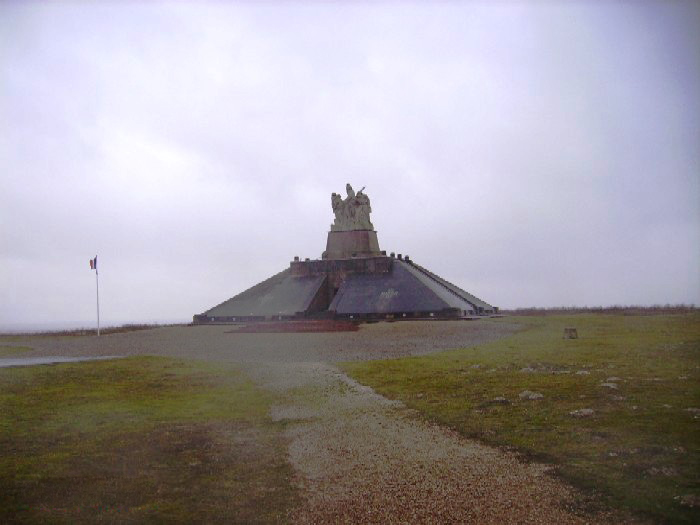
Ferme de Navarin War Memorial

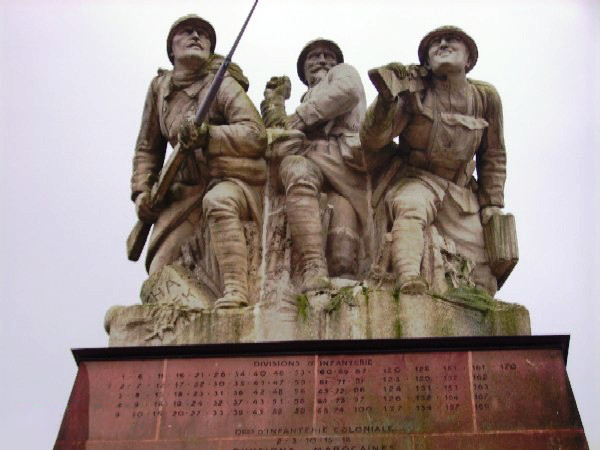
Ferme de Navarin

=== Russian Chapel and Cemetery at Saint-Hilaire-le-Grand ===
Russian Chapel and Cemetery at Saint-Hilaire-le-Grand
The cemetery is located in an area known as "L'Espérance", near the French military camp at Mourmelon, and was erected in memory of 4,000 Russian Expeditionary Force (REF) soldiers killed on the battlefields of Champagne fighting alongside the French and British armies. Their brigades occupied the Fort de la Pompelle near Reims and sustained heavy losses in the Nivelle offensive. Disbanded when the Russian Revolution broke out in October 1917, the officers, with some volunteers from the ranks, formed a "Légion russe d'honneur" and continued to fight until the end of the war, wearing French uniforms and being absorbed into the Moroccan Regiment.

In honour of their fallen, the survivors opened this Russian cemetery and later added a chapel, built in the Russian Orthodox style. The cemetery contains the bodies of 915 Russian soldiers either buried in ossuaries or individual graves (included in the gallery at the end of this article is a picture of a typical headstone and the marker for one of the ossuaries in the cemetery).

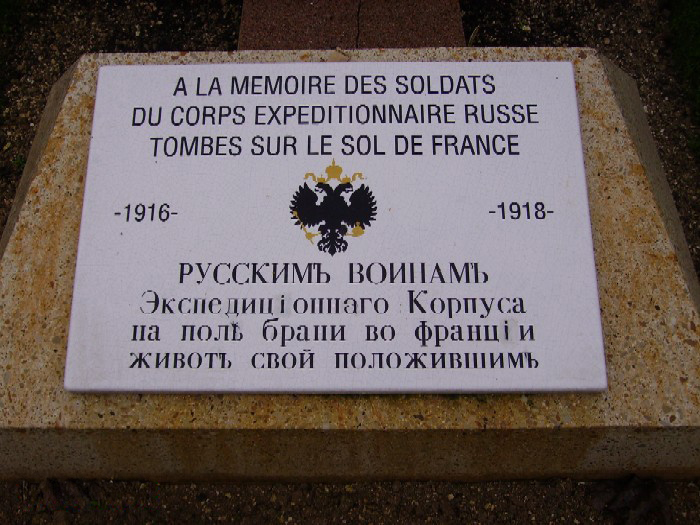
Plaque in the Russian Cemetery at Saint-Hilaire-le-Grand acknowledging the efforts of the Russian Expeditionary Force

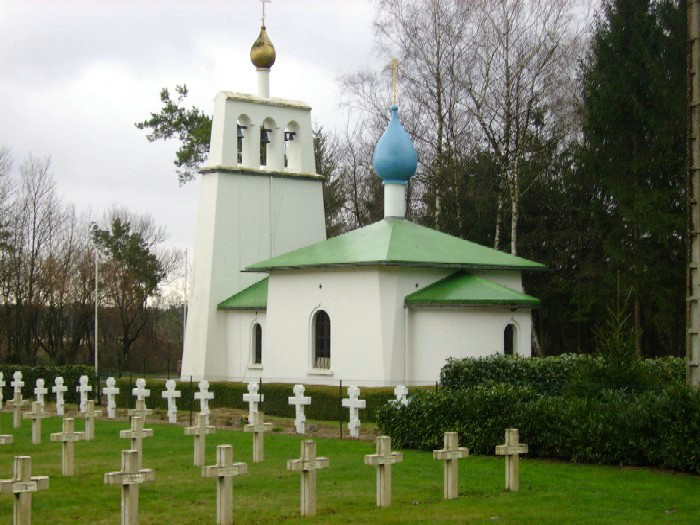
Chapel in Russian Cemetery at Saint-Hilaire-le-Grand

=== The Cemetery at "Wacques Farm" and the 28th Brigade Memorial ===
Nécropole nationale de Souain – 28e Brigade
This small French Military Cemetery is located near Châlons-en-Champagne and Saint-Hilaire-le-Grand, and is the burial place of 147 French soldiers. The monument to the 28th Brigade stands on a hill in the cemetery facing the Wacques Farm. This memorial consists of a large cross or calvary, which carries the inscription "Aux morts de la XXVIIIe Brigade" and is surrounded in a circle by many smaller crosses.

From 25 to 30 September 1915, the 28th Brigade fought in this area and lost 1,133 men including 39 officers. After the war, the chaplain of the 28th Brigade and several volunteers returned to the battlefield to locate and bury the rest of their comrades, and the monument and cemetery were inaugurated on 25 September 1919. This cemetery is officially named the "Nécropole nationale de Souain – 28e Brigade".

There is a smaller memorial next to the "Wacques Cross" dedicated to the men of the 44th Infantry, which carries the inscription: "Aux camarades tombés pendant les journées du 25-26-27-28-29 Septembre 1915. Etat-Major". Nearby, a memorial to the 60th Infantry is inscribed: "Aux morts du 60e RI Attaques des 25 au 29 – 09 – 1915"

=== The monument to the four corporals shot at Souain in 1915 ===
The monument to the four corporals shot at Souain in 1915
In March 1915, four corporals of the 21st Company of the 336th Regiment of Infantry – Louis Girard, Lucien Lechat, Louis Lefoulon et Théophile Maupas – were tried for mutiny and executed by firing squad. In his last letter to his wife, Maupas wrote "Je n'ai rien à me reprocher, je n'ai ni volé, ni tué, je n'ai sali ni la réputation ni l'honneur de personne. Je puis marcher la tête haute". The four soldiers had been selected randomly to be made examples of, when there had been a general refusal to obey a 10 March order to leave the trenches and attack the enemy.

For many years, Maupas' wife, Blanche Maupas, and others fought to have the men pardoned. In 1923, Blanche succeeded in having her husband's remains taken from the grave in Suippes and moved to the communal cemetery of Sartilly in La Manche. In 1925, a monument by Paul Moreau-Vauthier was erected over Maupas' grave at Sartilly, commemorating the four corporals of Souhain. In 1934, the four corporals were given a formal pardon by a special tribunal which came to the conclusion that the order they received was unreasonable. The Souain corporals affair was considered most controversial in France; the 1957 Stanley Kubrick film Paths of Glory, based on the events at Souhain, was banned in France until 1975 and was not shown on television until 1982. In 1962, Blanche Maupas died and was buried alongside her husband.

A monument honouring the four corporals stands in Suippes, facing the town hall where the military tribunal sentenced them to execution. It was inaugurated on 1 December 2007, with the inscription reading: "À la mémoire des caporaux de Souain Theophile Maupas, Louis Girard, Lucien Lechat et Louis Lefoulon Fusillés pour l'exemple, à Suippes, le 17 mars 1915".

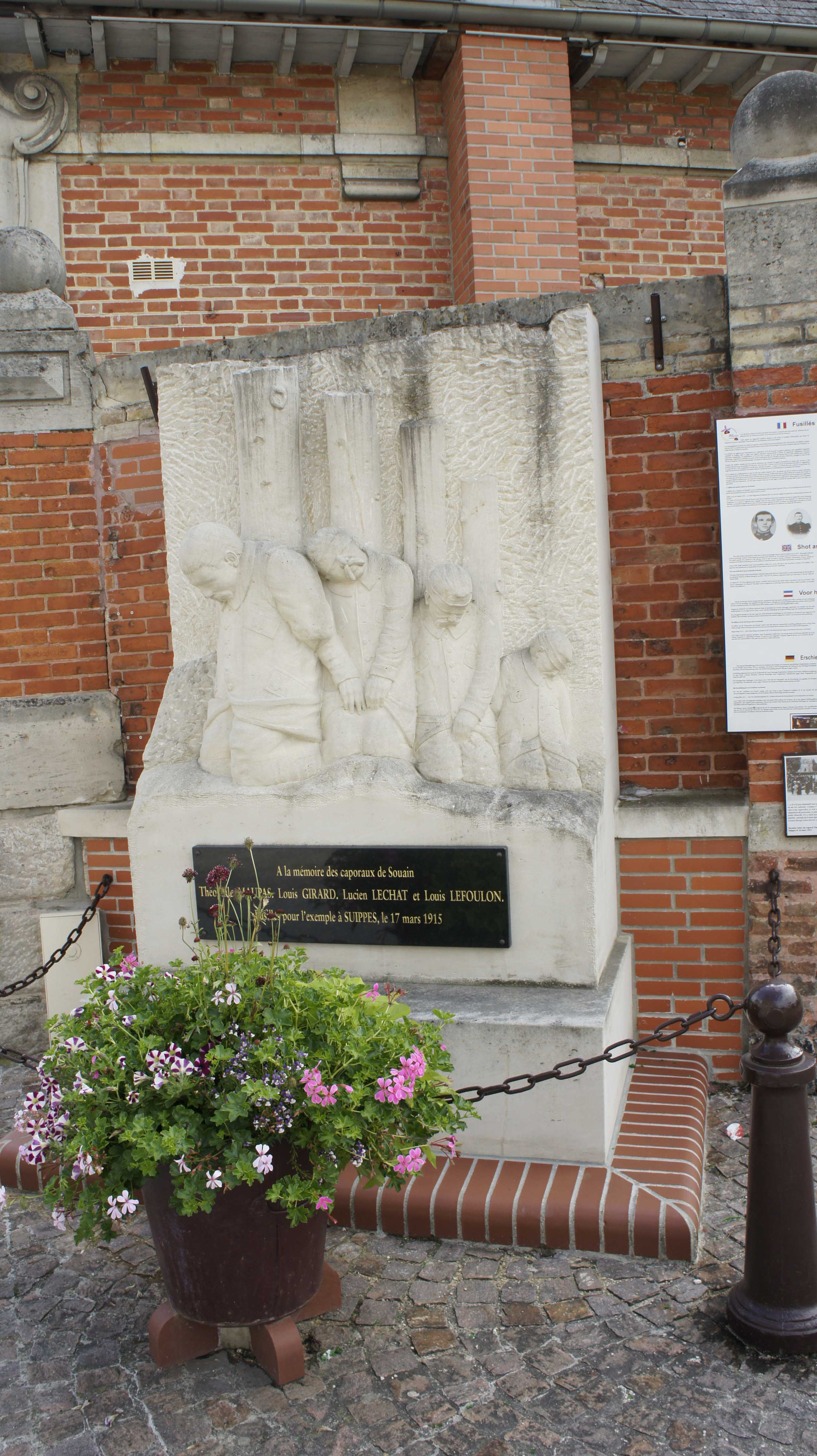
Memorial to four corporals executed at Suippes

=== The Memorial at Montagne de Bligny ===
The Memorial at Montagne de Bligny
This memorial to commemorates the actions of the 19th Division of the British Army. File WO 32/5885, held at The National Archives, covers the memorial at Montagne de Bligny near Reims. In the file is a photograph of the memorial, which takes the form of a simple cross.

=== German Cemetery at Saint-Étienne-à-Arnes ===
German Cemetery at Saint-Étienne-à-Arnes
Saint-Étienne-à-Arnes has a large German Military Cemetery which contains 12,541 bodies and a rare surviving German monument which is shown here. The inscription "GOTT MIT UNS" is a reminder that the German soldier also thought that God was on his side. An ossuary contains the remains of unidentified German soldiers and quotes from 2 Corinthians 6:9 "..the unknown men whom all men know; dying we still live on".

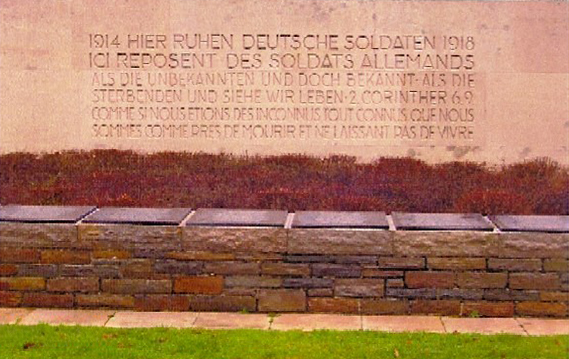
Plaque over ossuary in Saint-Étienne-à-Arnes quotes 2 Corinthians 6:9.

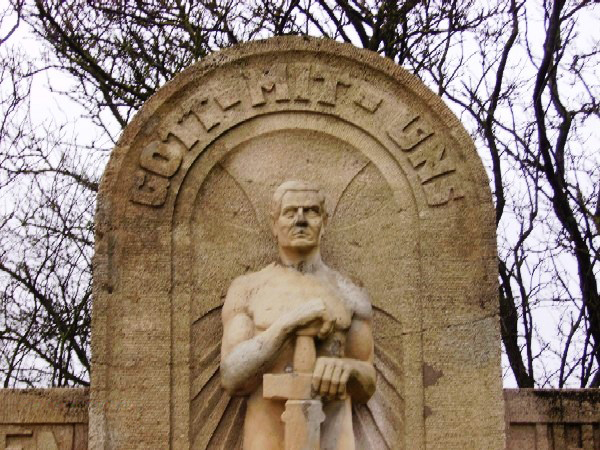
A German monument bearing the legend "Gott mit uns"

=== Gallery ===
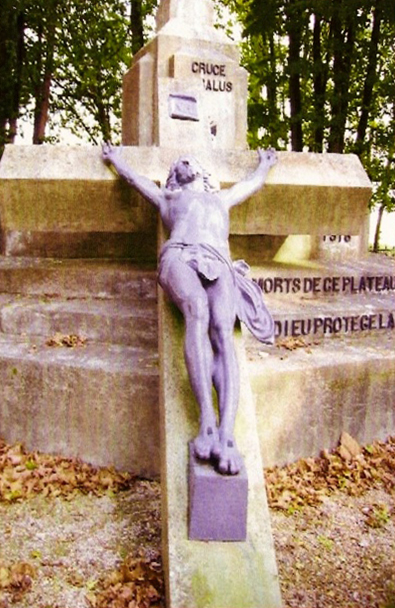
Memorial at Confrecourt

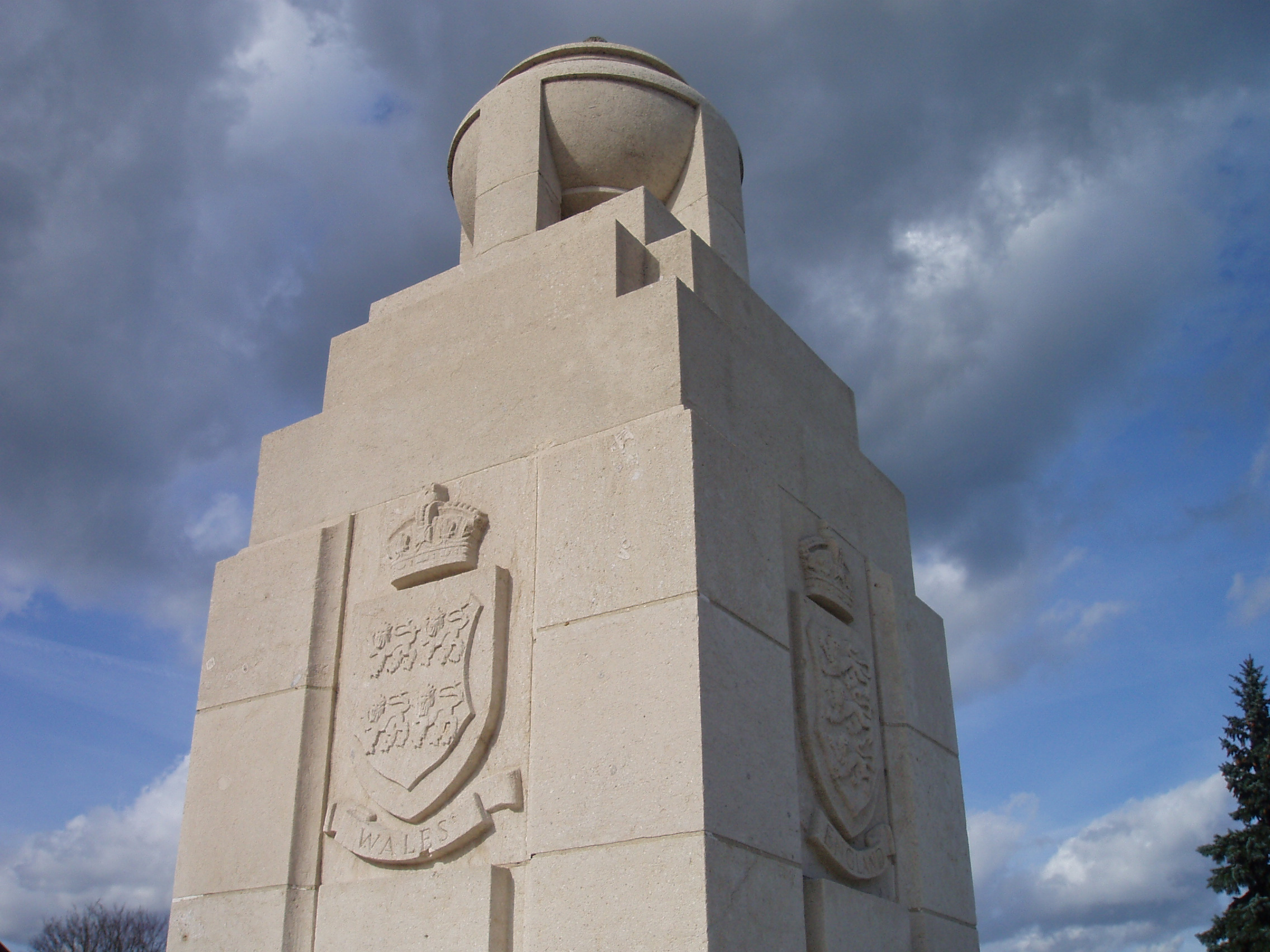
Part of the La Ferté-sous-Jouarre memorial

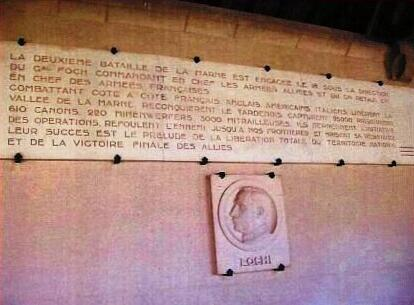
Foch depicted at Dormans on plaque which includes a description of the Second Battle of the Marne.

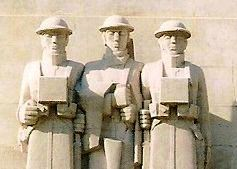
Kennington's sculpture at Soisson's "Memorial to the Missing"

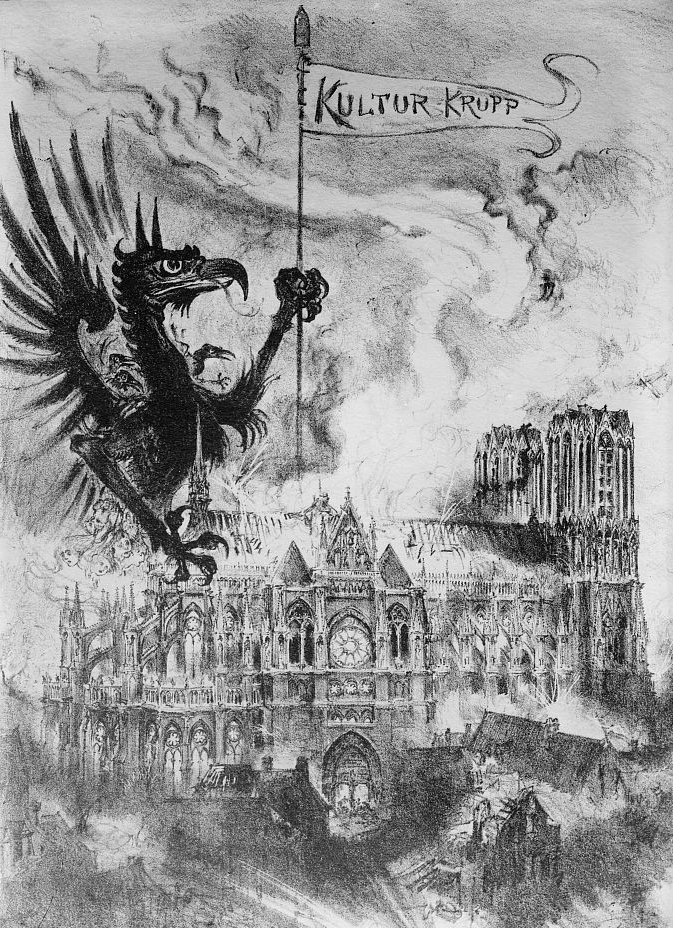
French Cartoon of Reims Cathedral bombarded by the German Army during World War I

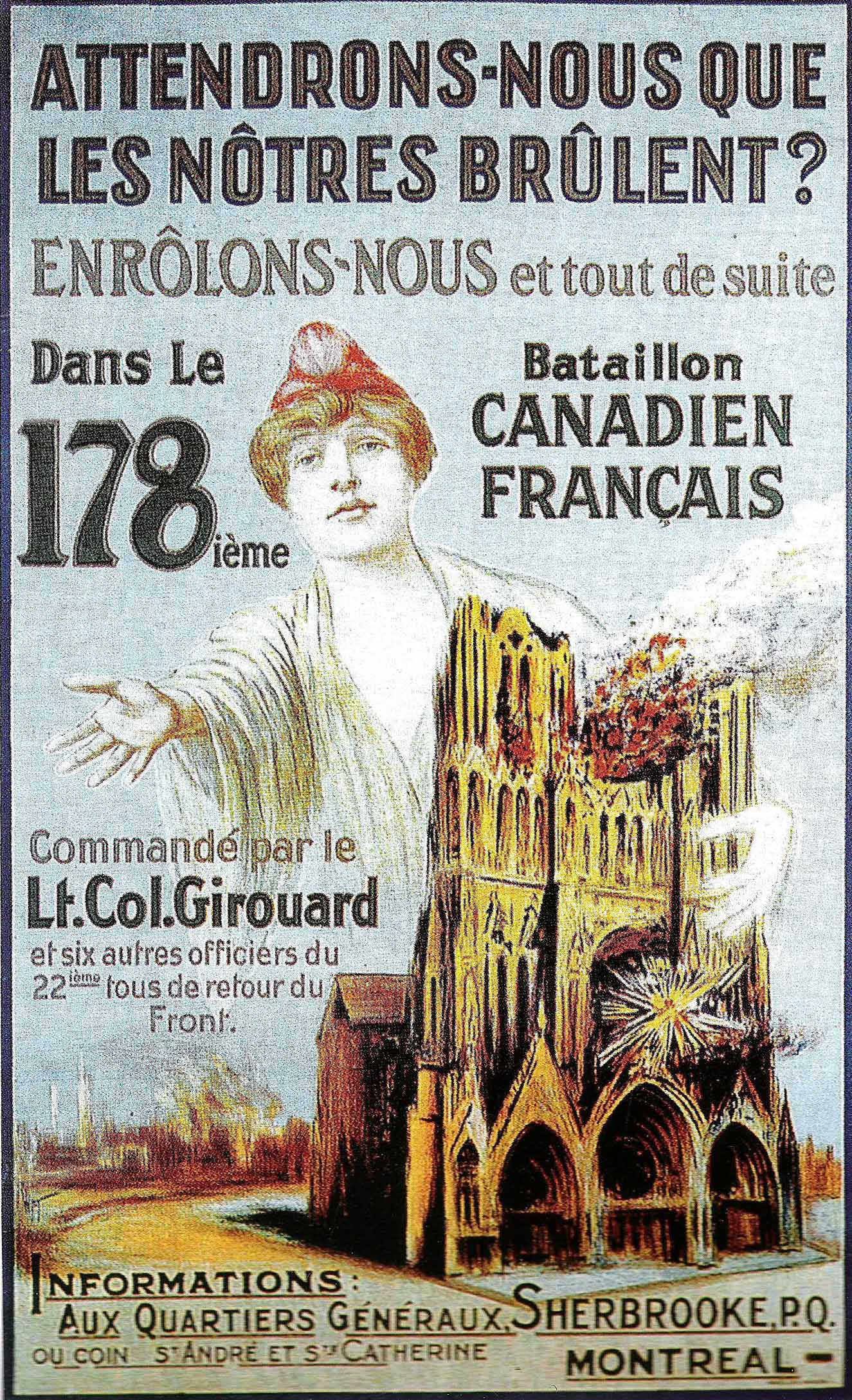
Poster showing Reims Cathedral asks French Canadians to enrol.

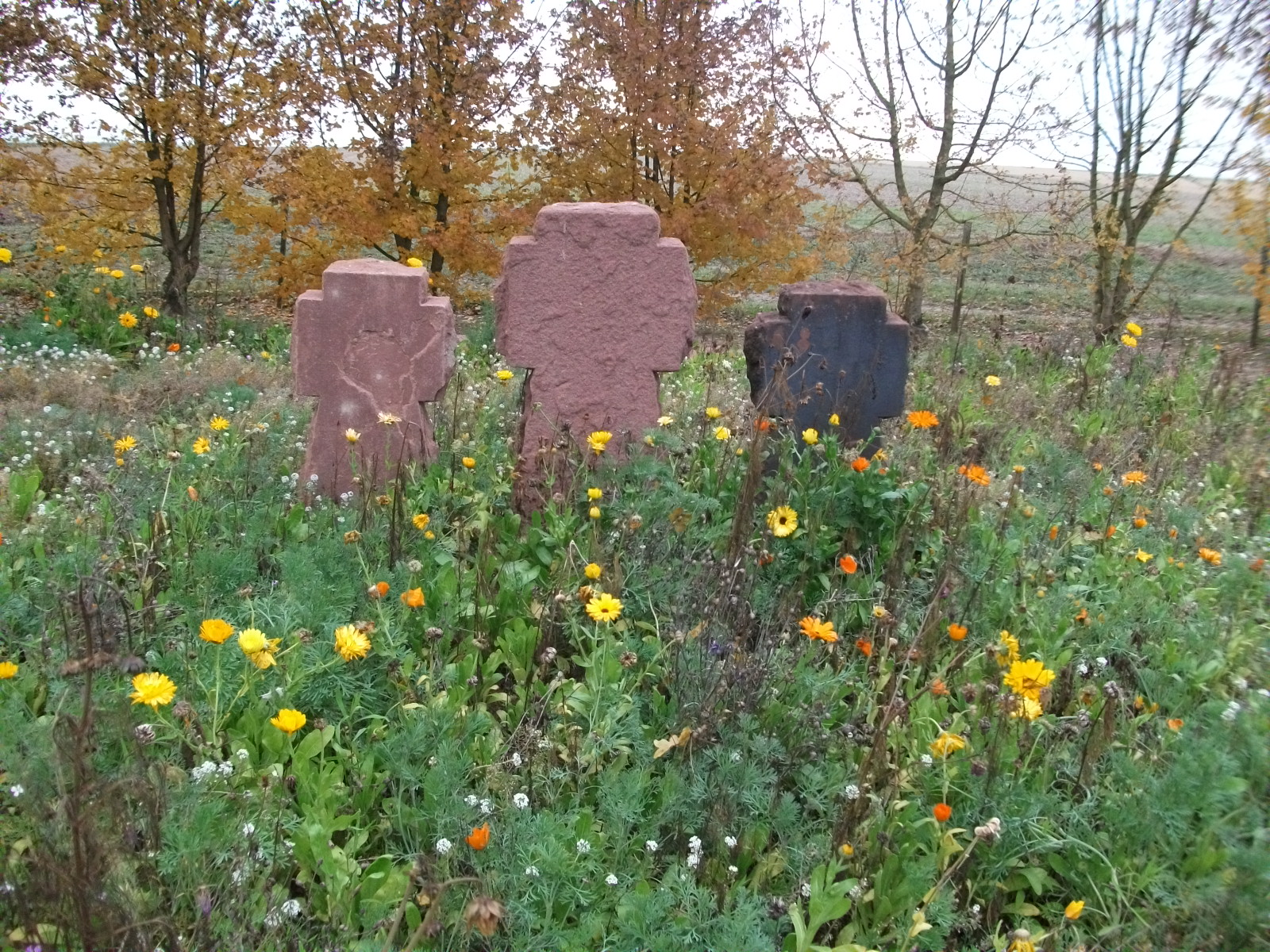
German graves at Aubérive

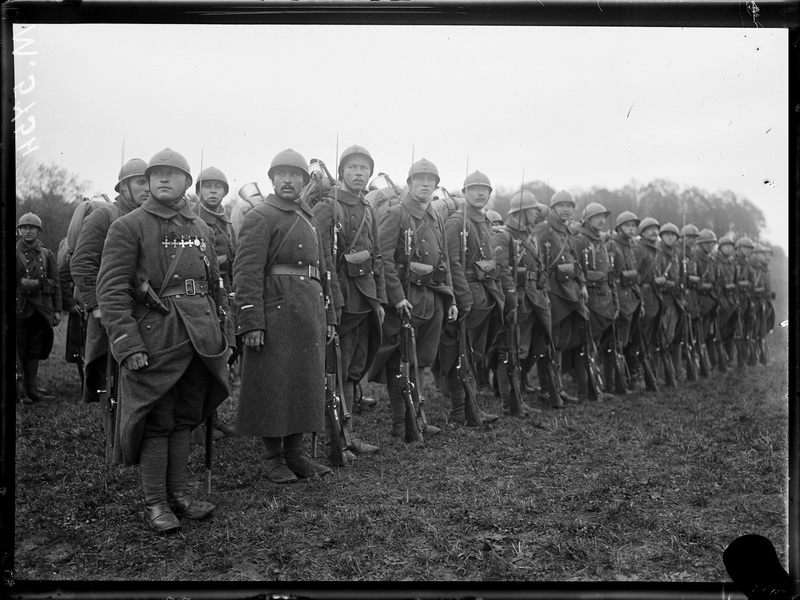
Russian soldiers in France

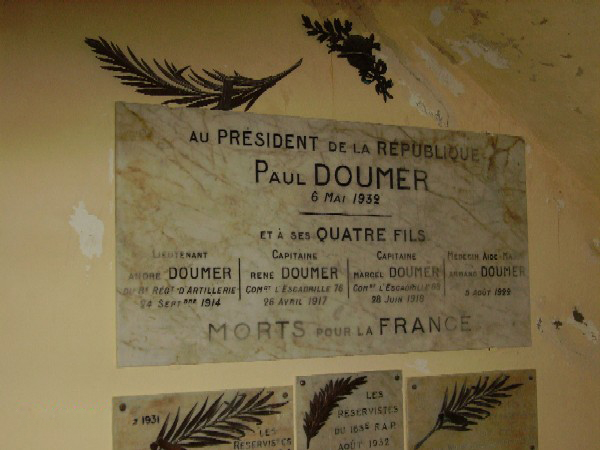
Plaque remembering the four sons of the French president at the Ferme de Navarin

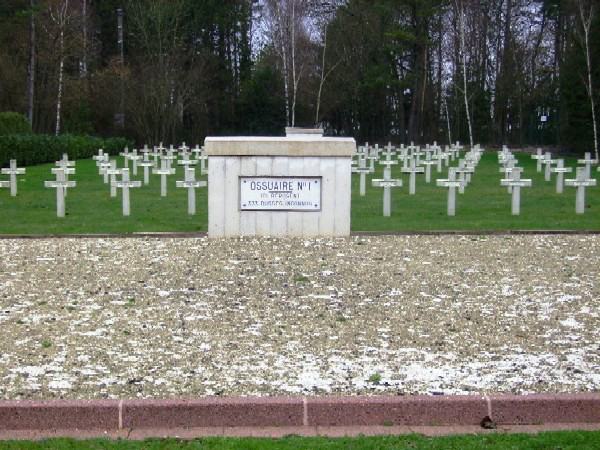
Ossuary in the Russian Cemetery at Saint-Hilaire-le-Grand

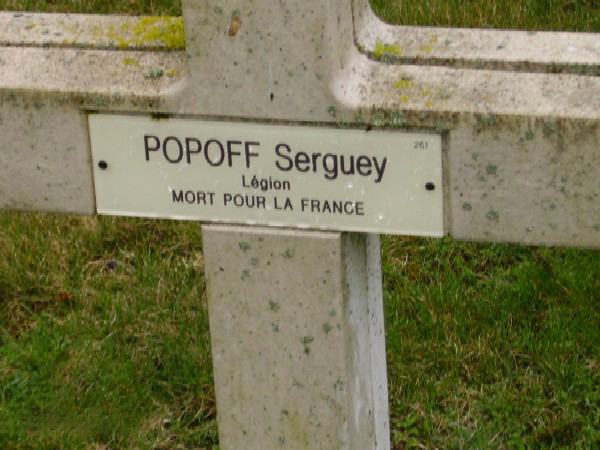
Russian headstone in the cemetery at Saint-Hilaire-le-Grand

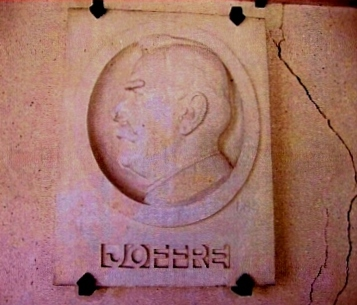
Joffre depicted at Dormans

== See also ==
- World War I memorials
- Monuments aux Morts – greater detail on French war memorials
- List of World War I Memorials and Cemeteries in Alsace
- List of World War I memorials and cemeteries in the Argonne
- List of World War I memorials and cemeteries in Artois
- List of World War I memorials and cemeteries in Flanders
- List of World War I Memorials and Cemeteries in Lorraine
- List of World War I memorials and cemeteries in the Somme
- List of World War I memorials and cemeteries in Verdun
- List of World War I memorials and cemeteries in the area of the St Mihiel salient
- War memorials (Aisne)
- War memorials (Oise)
- War memorials (Eastern Somme)
- War memorials (Western Somme)
