= Fresne =

Fresne may refer to:

Communes in France
Fresne, Le Fresneand Fresné is the name or part of the name of several communes in France:

- Le Fresne, Eure, in the Eure département
- Le Fresne, Marne, in the Marne département
- Le Fresne-Camilly, in the Calvados département
- Le Fresne-Poret, in the Manche département
- Le Fresne-sur-Loire, in the Loire-Atlantique département
- Fresne-Cauverville, in the Eure département
- Fresne-l'Archevêque, in the Eure département
- Fresnes, Val-de-Marne, in the Val-de-Marne département
- Fresne-Léguillon, in the Oise département
- Fresne-le-Plan, in the Seine-Maritime département
- Fresne-lès-Reims, in the Marne département
- Fresne-Saint-Mamès, in the Haute-Saône département
- Fresné-la-Mère, in the Calvados département

Other

- Le Fresne (lai), one of the Lais of Marie de France

== See also ==
- Fresnes (disambiguation)
- du Fresne
- de Fresne (disambiguation)
