= Col des Chevrères =

French mountain pass

- Location within Alps
- Elevation: 916 metres (3,005 ft)
- Traversed by: D133/D98

Third Approach
- Location: Haute-Saône, Franche-Comté, France
- Range: Vosges Mountains
- Coordinates: 47°47′29″N 6°44′32″E

The Col des Chevrères (elevation 916 m (3,005 ft)) is a mountain pass situated in the Vosges Mountains, in the Haute-Saône department of France, between Servance and Plancher-les-Mines. The Tour de France cycle race crossed the col for the first time on Stage 10 of the 2014 race.

== Cycle racing ==
=== Details of climb ===
From Servance, to the north-west, the climb is 10.8 km (6.7 mi) long, gaining 519 m (1,703 ft) in altitude, at an average gradient of 5%. The steepest sustained sections are in excess of 15%, although some short sections above Miellin are at 18%.

From Plancher-les-Mines, to the south, the climb via Belfahy is 12.8 km (8.0 mi) long, gaining 495 m (1,624 ft) in altitude, at an average gradient of 3.9%.

=== Tour de France ===
On July 14, 2014, the Tour de France cycle race crossed the col for the first time en route from Mulhouse to La Planche des Belles Filles. When announcing the route, Christian Prudhomme explained his reasons for deciding to send the 2014 Tour over passes not used previously: "I like to use the other massifs than the usual Alps and Pyrenees. I believe the race can be won and lost anytime."

The first rider over the summit was the Spaniard, Joaquim Rodriguez.
