= 2014 Tour de France, Stage 1 to Stage 11 =

101st edition of cycling race in France

The 2014 Tour de France was the 101st edition of the race, one of cycling's Grand Tours. It featured 22 cycling teams. The Tour started in Yorkshire, England on 5 July and finished on the Champs-Élysées in Paris on 27 July. The first two stages, in Yorkshire, were informally nicknamed Le Tour de Yorkshire; its success led to the formation of the Tour de Yorkshire stage race the following May.

== Classification standings ==
Legend
Yellow jersey	Denotes the leader of the General classification	Polka dot jersey	Denotes the leader of the Mountains classification
Green jersey	Denotes the leader of the Points classification	White jersey	Denotes the leader of the Young rider classification
Jersey with a yellow background on the number bib.	Denotes the leader of the Team classification		

== Stage 1 ==
5 July 2014 — Leeds to Harrogate, 190.5 km (118 mi)

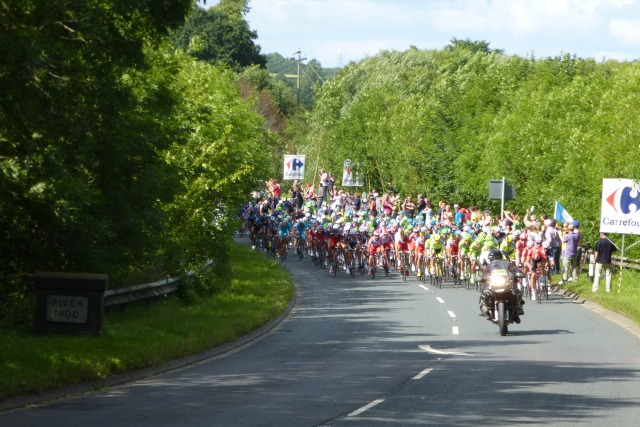
Peloton near Killinghall

The first stage began on The Headrow, outside the Victorian Town Hall in Leeds. The tour headed eastwards through the city centre towards Quarry Hill, navigating the Sheepscar Interchange onto the A61 and heading northwards through the city districts of Scott Hall, Moortown and Alwoodley towards Harewood House where a ceremonial start took place. This was attended by the Duke and Duchess of Cambridge, and Prince Harry. Following the departure from Harewood, the tour went along the Wharfe Valley passing through Otley, Burley in Wharfedale and the home of the Cow and Calf Rocks, Ilkley Moor. The race then headed north via the A65 to the market town of Skipton, before passing into the Yorkshire Dales National Park. After passing northwards through part of Wharfedale, into Wensleydale and through Hawes, the route continued over the Buttertubs Pass and down through Swaledale to Reeth. The race then headed south-east to cross the last categorised climb of the day at Grinton Moor before passing through Leyburn, the brewery town of Masham and the cathedral city of Ripon. Finally, travelling southwards, on the A61, through Killinghall and finishing at West Park in Harrogate.

A 50 km (31 mi) break saw Jens Voigt secure the King of the Mountains jersey for the day, before returning to the peloton. The finale of the stage saw Mark Cavendish crash during the sprint, following a collision with Simon Gerrans. Cavendish suffered a separated right shoulder injury. The sprint was won by Marcel Kittel, thus repeating his opening stage victory from the previous year.

Stage 1 result & General classification after Stage 1

Rank	Rider	Team	Time
1	Marcel Kittel (GER)	Giant–Shimano	4h 44' 07"
2	Peter Sagan (SVK)	Cannondale	+ 0"
3	Ramūnas Navardauskas (LTU)	Garmin–Sharp	+ 0"
4	Bryan Coquard (FRA)	Team Europcar	+ 0"
5	Michael Rogers (AUS)	Tinkoff–Saxo	+ 0"
6	Chris Froome (GBR)	Team Sky	+ 0"
7	Alexander Kristoff (NOR)	Team Katusha	+ 0"
8	Sep Vanmarcke (BEL)	Belkin Pro Cycling	+ 0"
9	José Joaquín Rojas (ESP)	Movistar Team	+ 0"
10	Michael Albasini (SUI)	Orica–GreenEDGE	+ 0"

== Stage 2 ==
6 July 2014 — York to Sheffield, 201 km (125 mi)

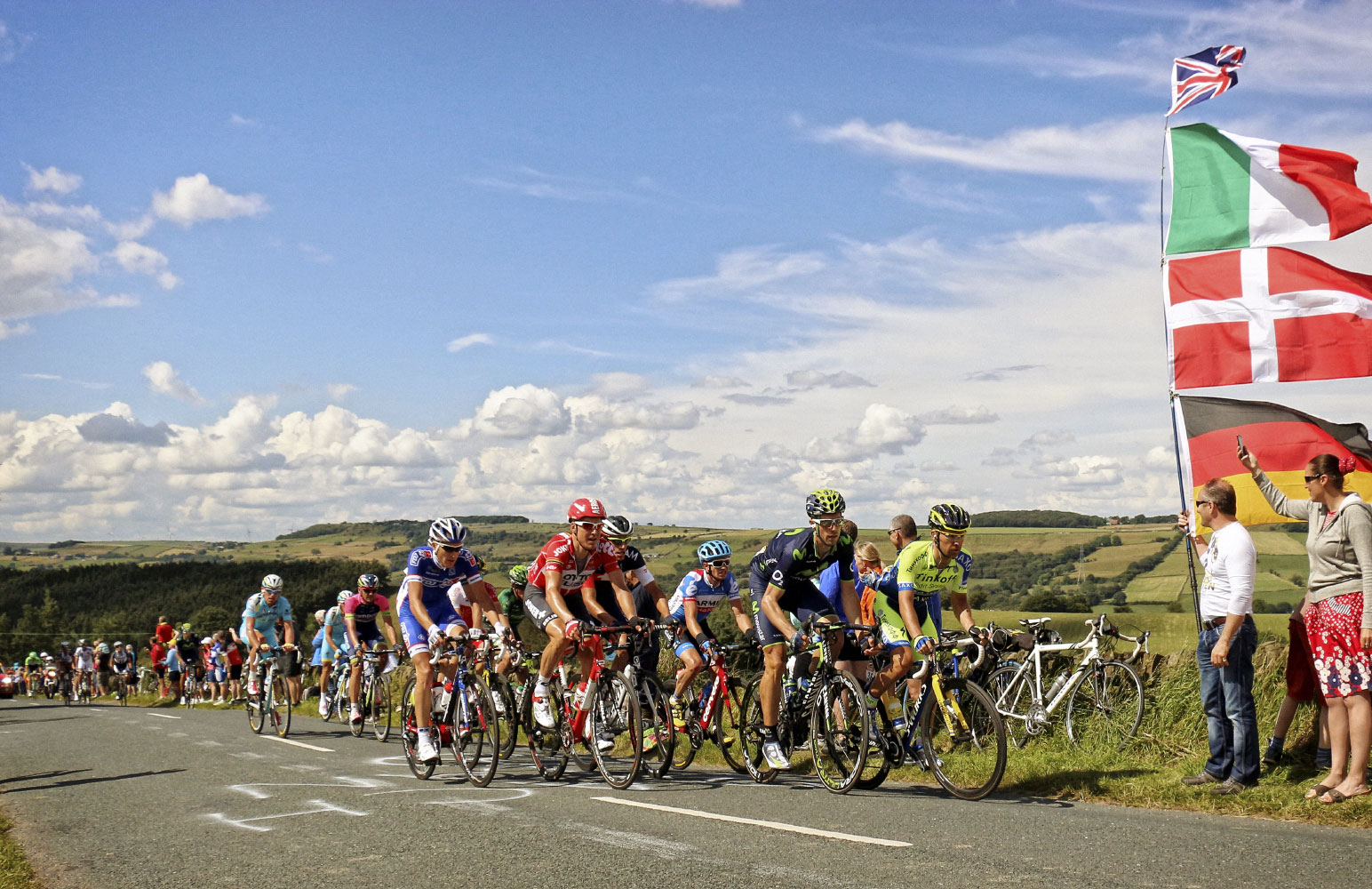
The peloton passing Midhopestones

The second stage of the tour started at the racecourse in York heading to the city centre where it then travelled into West Yorkshire through the towns of Knaresborough, Harrogate, Silsden, Addingham, Keighley, Haworth, Hebden Bridge, Mytholmroyd, Elland, Huddersfield, Honley and Holmfirth. The tour then climbed over the Category 2 Côte de Holme Moss at 524 m (1,719 ft), and descended into the valley of the Woodhead pass. Passing into Derbyshire on the northern tip of the Peak District under the shadow of the Bleaklow plateau it then climbed over the Langsett Moors. Traversing across the moor the route crossed the Ewden valley and headed towards the village of Bradfield. From here the route descended towards the city of Sheffield where stage two finished.

During the stage, Sacha Modolo withdrew from the tour due to illness. Cyril Lemoine took the lead for the King of the Mountains jersey, from Jens Voigt, having scored the most points during the day. Blel Kadri and Thomas Voeckler were the first two riders over the Category 2 climb of Holme Moss, both riders later returning to the peloton. Towards the finish, Alberto Contador and Chris Froome each took the opportunity to test the opposition, reducing the peloton to a leading group of 21 riders up the short, but steep, Category 4 climb of Jenkin Road Hill. Vincenzo Nibali took the lead with 2 km (1 mi) remaining, and held this short lead to the finish line.

Stage 2 result

Rank	Rider	Team	Time
1	Vincenzo Nibali (ITA)	Astana	5h 08' 36"
2	Greg Van Avermaet (BEL)	BMC Racing Team	+ 2"
3	Michał Kwiatkowski (POL)	Omega Pharma–Quick-Step	+ 2"
4	Peter Sagan (SVK)	Cannondale	+ 2"
5	Tony Gallopin (FRA)	Lotto–Belisol	+ 2"
6	Michael Albasini (SUI)	Orica–GreenEDGE	+ 2"
7	Andrew Talansky (USA)	Garmin–Sharp	+ 2"
8	Bauke Mollema (NED)	Belkin Pro Cycling	+ 2"
9	Tejay van Garderen (USA)	BMC Racing Team	+ 2"
10	Romain Bardet (FRA)	Ag2r–La Mondiale	+ 2"

General classification after stage 2

Rank	Rider	Team	Time
1	Vincenzo Nibali (ITA)	Astana	9h 52' 43"
2	Peter Sagan (SVK)	Cannondale	+ 2"
3	Greg Van Avermaet (BEL)	BMC Racing Team	+ 2"
4	Michael Albasini (SUI)	Orica–GreenEDGE	+ 2"
5	Chris Froome (GBR)	Team Sky	+ 2"
6	Bauke Mollema (NED)	Belkin Pro Cycling	+ 2"
7	Jurgen Van den Broeck (BEL)	Lotto–Belisol	+ 2"
8	Alberto Contador (ESP)	Tinkoff–Saxo	+ 2"
9	Tejay van Garderen (USA)	BMC Racing Team	+ 2"
10	Jakob Fuglsang (DEN)	Astana	+ 2"

== Stage 3 ==
7 July 2014 — Cambridge to London, 155 km (96 mi)

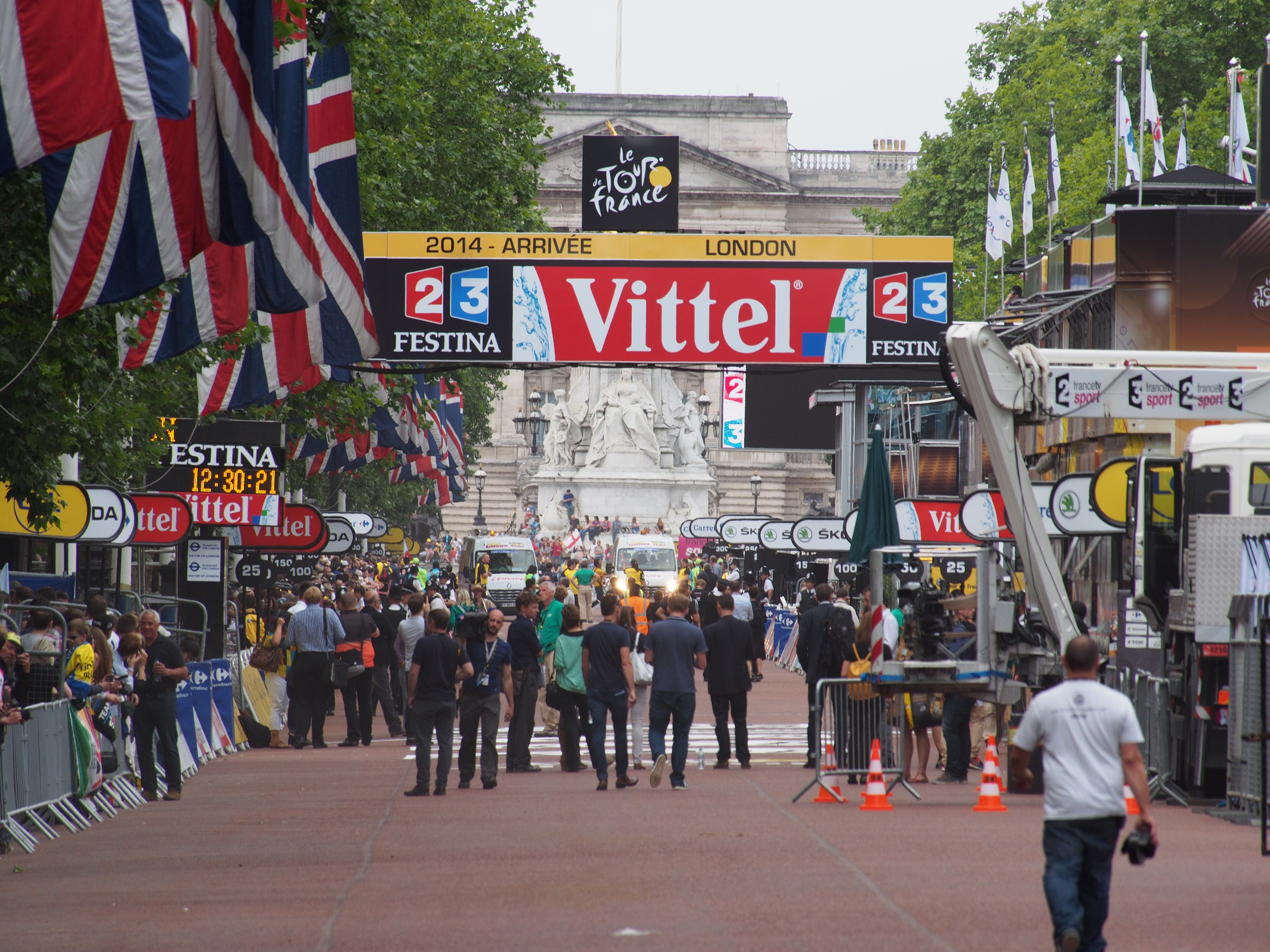
The finish line on The Mall, London, with Buckingham Palace in the background

This short 155 km stage began at Parker's Piece in the university city of Cambridge and started by heading in a generally southern direction towards Saffron Walden. From Saffron Walden the route travelled east, and then south, to the western outskirts of Braintree, Essex, before following the road west to Felsted. The route turned south to Chelmsford, and then west to an intermediate sprint at Epping Forest. From here, the race continued south into the British capital, which hosted the Grand Départ during the 2007 Tour de France. This was a prestigious stage which took the peloton through the Queen Elizabeth Olympic Park, and travelled past some of London's most famous landmarks, before finishing near to Buckingham Palace, with the finish line on The Mall.

Jean-Marc Bideau and Jan Bárta spent 147 km (91 mi) out in front of the peloton, which was the greater part of the stage. Both riders each taking part in their first Tour de France, Bideau was the first to succumb to the gradual acceleration of the peloton, with 8 km (5 mi) remaining, on the outskirts of central London. Meanwhile, Bárta managed to stay in front for a further 2 km (1 mi). The peloton was then together for a bunch sprint on The Mall. Marcel Kittel succeeded in securing his sixth stage win at the Tour de France, and his second stage win of the 2014 Tour.

Stage 3 result

Rank	Rider	Team	Time
1	Marcel Kittel (GER)	Giant–Shimano	3h 38' 30"
2	Peter Sagan (SVK)	Cannondale	+ 0"
3	Mark Renshaw (AUS)	Omega Pharma–Quick-Step	+ 0"
4	Bryan Coquard (FRA)	Team Europcar	+ 0"
5	Alexander Kristoff (NOR)	Team Katusha	+ 0"
6	Danny van Poppel (NED)	Trek Factory Racing	+ 0"
7	Heinrich Haussler (AUS)	IAM Cycling	+ 0"
8	José Joaquín Rojas (ESP)	Movistar Team	+ 0"
9	Romain Feillu (FRA)	Bretagne–Séché Environnement	+ 0"
10	Daniel Oss (ITA)	BMC Racing Team	+ 0"

General classification after stage 3

Rank	Rider	Team	Time
1	Vincenzo Nibali (ITA)	Astana	13h 31' 13"
2	Peter Sagan (SVK)	Cannondale	+ 2"
3	Michael Albasini (SUI)	Orica–GreenEDGE	+ 2"
4	Greg Van Avermaet (BEL)	BMC Racing Team	+ 2"
5	Chris Froome (GBR)	Team Sky	+ 2"
6	Bauke Mollema (NED)	Belkin Pro Cycling	+ 2"
7	Alberto Contador (ESP)	Tinkoff–Saxo	+ 2"
8	Alejandro Valverde (ESP)	Movistar Team	+ 2"
9	Jurgen Van den Broeck (BEL)	Lotto–Belisol	+ 2"
10	Romain Bardet (FRA)	Ag2r–La Mondiale	+ 2"

== Stage 4 ==
8 July 2014 — Le Touquet-Paris-Plage to Lille Métropole, 163.5 km (102 mi)

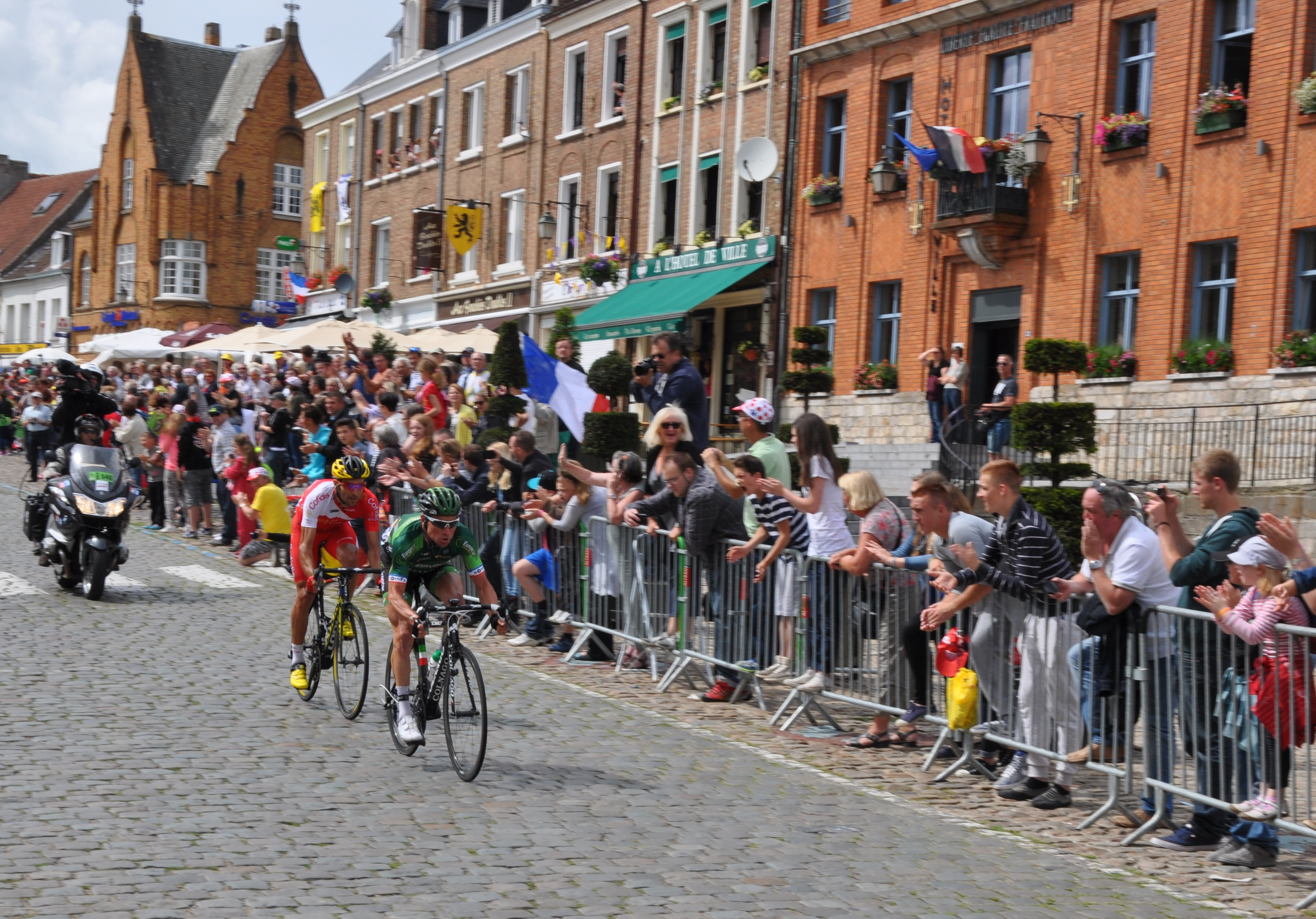
Thomas Voeckler passes at Cassel, followed by Luis Ángel Maté, nearly two minutes ahead of the peloton.

The first stage in France departed from the seaside resort of Le Touquet, with racing officially starting just east of Cucq. The first climb of the day was the Category 4 climb of the Côte de Campagnette, 34 km (21 mi) into the stage, just north of Bimont. At 159 m (522 ft), this was the highest point of a relatively fast and flat stage, which travelled through the undulating lowlands of Nord-Pas-de-Calais. The route passed through Saint-Omer, with an intermediate sprint at Cassel. The race then travelled through Steenvoorde, over the Category 4 climb of Mont Noir, and followed the road south-east from Bailleul and Armentières to Lille. The stage finished just east of the centre of Lille, at Villeneuve-d'Ascq.

Andy Schleck retired from the tour, before the departure from Le Touquet. A few kilometres into the stage, Chris Froome fell in an accident which also involved Bauke Mollema and Ion Izagirre. Froome was able to rejoin the peloton. By the time the race had reached the top of Mont Noir, Thomas Voeckler was in front of the peloton along with Luis Ángel Maté. Greg Henderson was forced to retire, following a crash towards the end of the race, whilst Voeckler was caught by the peloton with 16 km (10 mi) remaining, with Maté also returning to the bunch around this time. The peloton was ready, once again, for a sprint finish. Marcel Kittel won his third stage out of four, but admitted that the stage had been fast and very nervous.

Stage 4 result

Rank	Rider	Team	Time
1	Marcel Kittel (GER)	Giant–Shimano	3h 36' 39"
2	Alexander Kristoff (NOR)	Team Katusha	+ 0"
3	Arnaud Démare (FRA)	FDJ.fr	+ 0"
4	Peter Sagan (SVK)	Cannondale	+ 0"
5	Bryan Coquard (FRA)	Team Europcar	+ 0"
6	André Greipel (GER)	Lotto–Belisol	+ 0"
7	Mark Renshaw (AUS)	Omega Pharma–Quick-Step	+ 0"
8	Danny van Poppel (NED)	Trek Factory Racing	+ 0"
9	Davide Cimolai (ITA)	Lampre–Merida	+ 0"
10	Daniel Oss (ITA)	BMC Racing Team	+ 0"

General classification after stage 4

Rank	Rider	Team	Time
1	Vincenzo Nibali (ITA)	Astana	17h 07' 52"
2	Peter Sagan (SVK)	Cannondale	+ 2"
3	Michael Albasini (SUI)	Orica–GreenEDGE	+ 2"
4	Greg Van Avermaet (BEL)	BMC Racing Team	+ 2"
5	Alberto Contador (ESP)	Tinkoff–Saxo	+ 2"
6	Alejandro Valverde (ESP)	Movistar Team	+ 2"
7	Chris Froome (GBR)	Team Sky	+ 2"
8	Jurgen Van den Broeck (BEL)	Lotto–Belisol	+ 2"
9	Bauke Mollema (NED)	Belkin Pro Cycling	+ 2"
10	Jakob Fuglsang (DEN)	Astana	+ 2"

== Stage 5 ==
9 July 2014 — Ypres to Arenberg Porte du Hainaut, 155.5 km (97 mi)

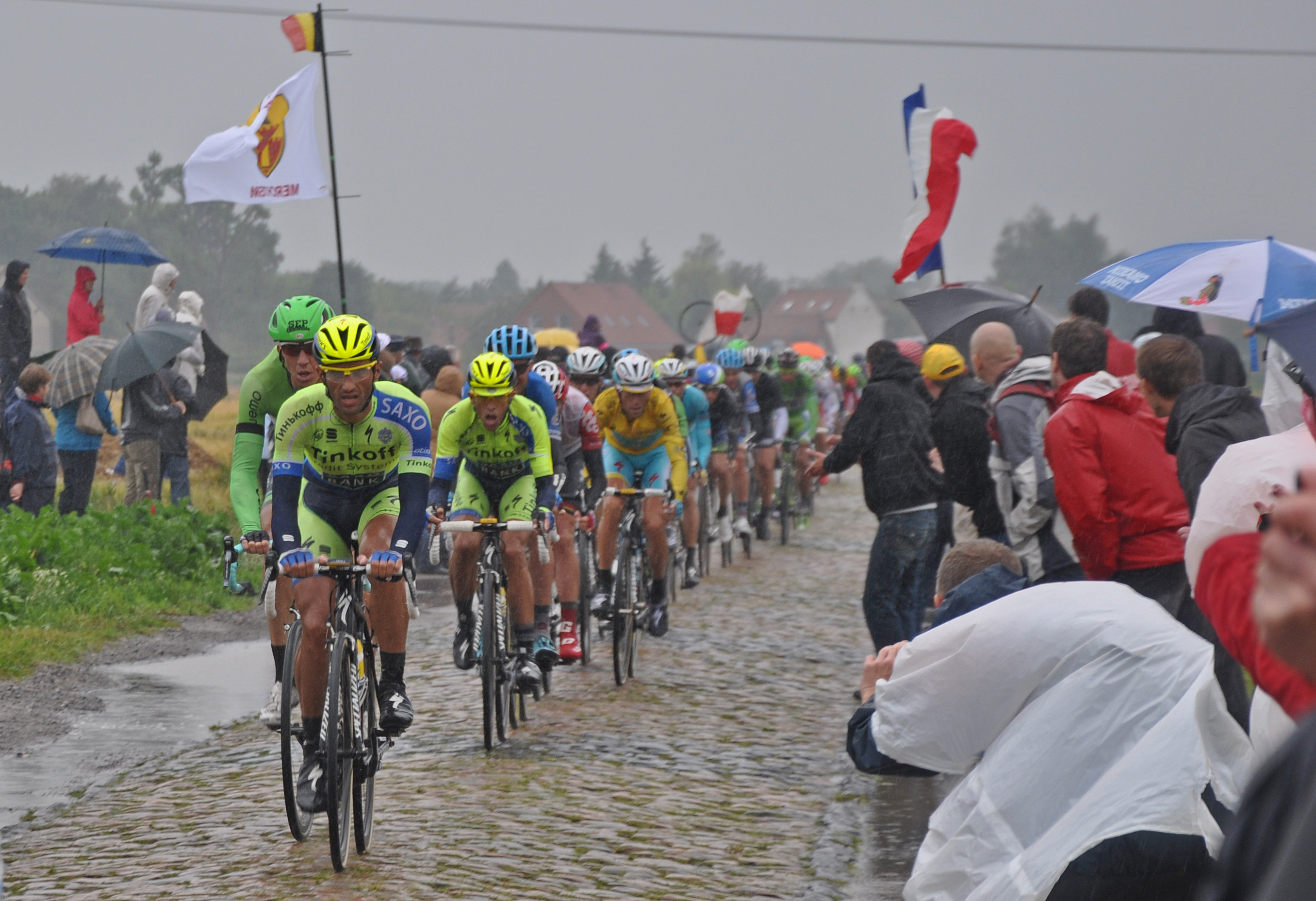
The peloton on the cobbles, in the rain, at Gruson. This was on the route between Roubaix and Templeuve-en-Pévèle.

This flat stage departed from Ypres in Belgium. Eddy Merckx and King Philippe were both present to see the riders depart. Racing officially started between Ypres and Zonnebeke. The race then headed north-east towards Roeselare, before turning due south to Menen and then on to Wevelgem. The stage continued south, re-entering France just before arriving in Roubaix. From here, onwards, the stage featured nine sections of difficult cobble-set pavement, using some of the same roads as the Paris–Roubaix cycle race. The intermediate sprint took place a further 32.5 km (20 mi) along the route south from Roubaix at Templeuve-en-Pévèle. The race then took a circuitous route west to Pont-à-Marcq, south to Bersée, and then east to Orchies. The culmination of the stage had the riders pass through several small villages in quick succession; Beuvry-la-Forêt, Tilloy-lez-Marchiennes, Warlaing, Wandignies-Hamage, Hornaing and Hélesmes. Finally, the stage finished just east of Wallers at the southern end of the Arenberg Trench, adjacent to the Arenberg Mine.

Inclement weather prompted tour organizers to remove two cobble segments from the stage route for safety reasons, leaving seven cobble segments for the riders to navigate.

Wet roads contributed to a multitude of crashes before the riders encountered the cobbles. Reigning champion Chris Froome was involved in two crashes at the 35 km (22 mi) point and the 83 km (52 mi) point. These crashes, combined with a crash the previous day and the lingering effects of a serious crash in the Critérium du Dauphiné several weeks prior, forced his abandonment from the race.

Upon encountering the cobbles, the peloton splintered, with yellow jersey-wearer Vincenzo Nibali's team Astana leading the pack. Nibali's group opened up a lead of nearly two minutes prior to encountering the seventh and last cobble segment, upon which Astana's Lieuwe Westra accelerated, leaving behind all but Nibali, teammate Jakob Fuglsang, and Belkin Pro Cycling's Lars Boom. Boom attacked the Astana riders on the last cobble segment and held his lead through the final kilometers to take his first victory of the 2014 season, as well as his first career stage win in the Tour de France. This came nine years to the day after the previous Dutch stage victory in the Tour. Nibali finished 19 seconds behind Boom, in so doing putting two minutes into GC contenders Andrew Talansky, Tejay van Garderen, and Alejandro Valverde, and nearly two-and-a-half minutes into Tour favorite Alberto Contador.

Stage 5 result

Rank	Rider	Team	Time
1	Lars Boom (NED)	Belkin Pro Cycling	3h 18' 35"
2	Jakob Fuglsang (DEN)	Astana	+ 19"
3	Vincenzo Nibali (ITA)	Astana	+ 19"
4	Peter Sagan (SVK)	Cannondale	+ 1' 01"
5	Fabian Cancellara (SUI)	Trek Factory Racing	+ 1' 01"
6	Jens Keukeleire (BEL)	Orica–GreenEDGE	+ 1' 01"
7	Michał Kwiatkowski (POL)	Omega Pharma–Quick-Step	+ 1' 07"
8	Lieuwe Westra (NED)	Astana	+ 1' 09"
9	Matteo Trentin (ITA)	Omega Pharma–Quick-Step	+ 1' 21"
10	Cyril Lemoine (FRA)	Cofidis	+ 1' 45"

General classification after stage 5

Rank	Rider	Team	Time
1	Vincenzo Nibali (ITA)	Astana	20h 26' 46"
2	Jakob Fuglsang (DEN)	Astana	+ 2"
3	Peter Sagan (SVK)	Cannondale	+ 44"
4	Michał Kwiatkowski (POL)	Omega Pharma–Quick-Step	+ 50"
5	Fabian Cancellara (SUI)	Trek Factory Racing	+ 1' 17"
6	Jurgen Van den Broeck (BEL)	Lotto–Belisol	+ 1' 45"
7	Tony Gallopin (FRA)	Lotto–Belisol	+ 1' 45"
8	Richie Porte (AUS)	Team Sky	+ 1' 54"
9	Andrew Talansky (USA)	Garmin–Sharp	+ 2' 05"
10	Alejandro Valverde (ESP)	Movistar Team	+ 2' 11"

== Stage 6 ==
10 July 2014 — Arras to Reims, 194 km (121 mi)

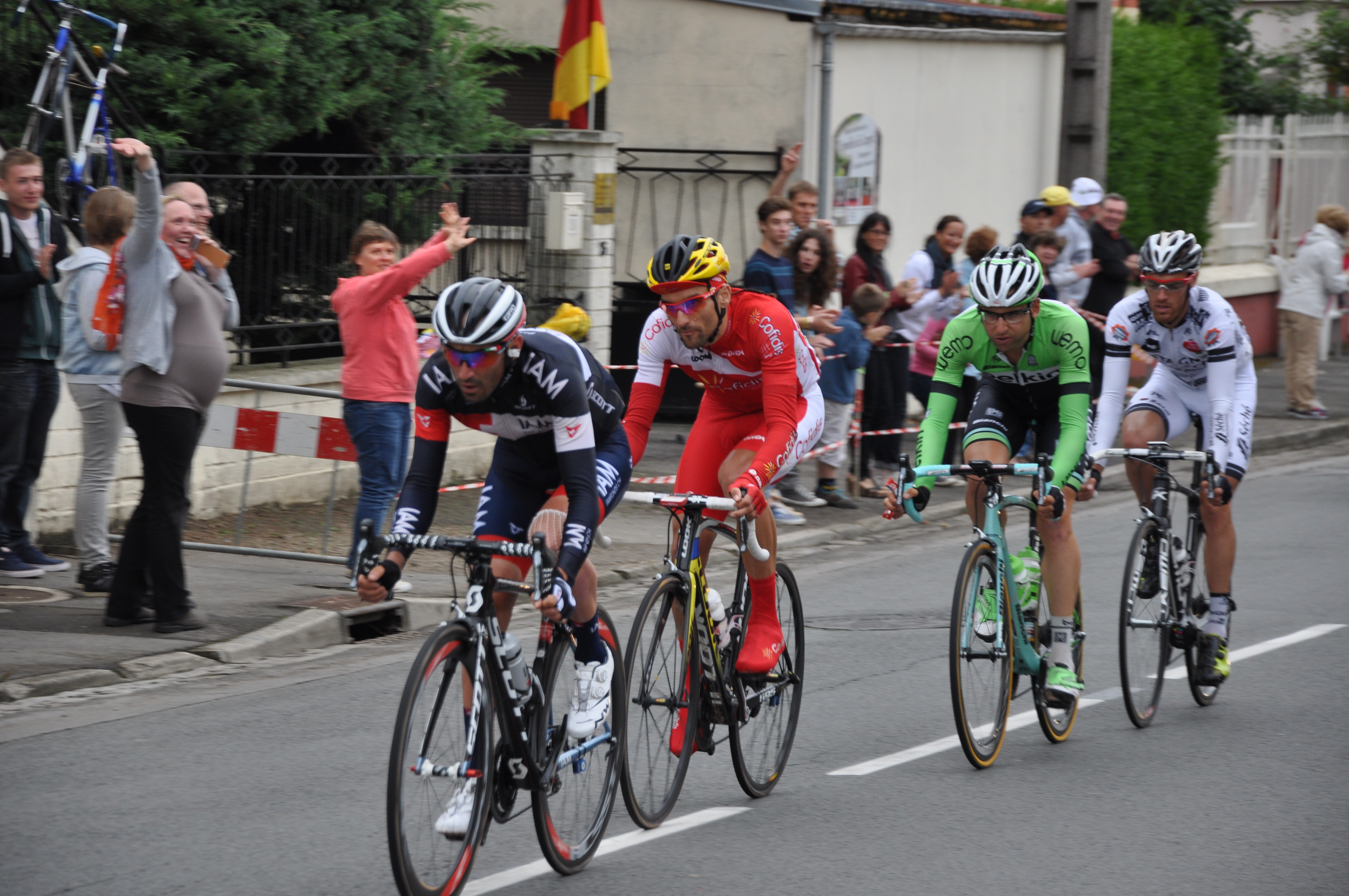
The early breakaway at Tergnier

This relatively fast and flat stage travelled from the department of Pas de Calais, through the departments of Somme, Aisne, and Marne. The stage started by heading south through Bapaume, Péronne, Ham, Tergnier and Chauny. The route then began to head east, over the Category 4 climb of Côte de Coucy-le-Château-Auffrique, with an intermediate sprint 12 km (7 mi) later at Pinon. This was followed by the Category 4 climb of the Côte de Roucy, and the road east to Bourgogne. Finally, the race headed south into Reims.

Arnaud Gérard, Tom Leezer, Luis Maté and Jérôme Pineau took part in an early escape, ahead of the peloton. Crashes occurred during a day of sidewinds, along with a second day of rain, forcing the retirement of Xabier Zandio and Jesús Hernández, amongst others. The early escapees were each brought back to the peloton from 20 km (12 mi) remaining, with Maté managing to stay in front for a further 8 km (5 mi). Marcel Kittel had a mechanical problem in the final 2 km (1 mi), and Michał Kwiatkowski attacked with 1 km (1 mi) remaining. However, the sprint was won by André Greipel who, along with other sprinters, caught Kwiatkowski before the finish.

Stage 6 result

Rank	Rider	Team	Time
1	André Greipel (GER)	Lotto–Belisol	4h 11' 39"
2	Alexander Kristoff (NOR)	Team Katusha	+ 0"
3	Samuel Dumoulin (FRA)	Ag2r–La Mondiale	+ 0"
4	Mark Renshaw (AUS)	Omega Pharma–Quick-Step	+ 0"
5	Peter Sagan (SVK)	Cannondale	+ 0"
6	Romain Feillu (FRA)	Bretagne–Séché Environnement	+ 0"
7	Tom Veelers (NED)	Giant–Shimano	+ 0"
8	Bryan Coquard (FRA)	Team Europcar	+ 0"
9	Sep Vanmarcke (BEL)	Belkin Pro Cycling	+ 0"
10	Sylvain Chavanel (FRA)	IAM Cycling	+ 0"

General classification after stage 6

Rank	Rider	Team	Time
1	Vincenzo Nibali (ITA)	Astana	24h 38' 25"
2	Jakob Fuglsang (DEN)	Astana	+ 2"
3	Peter Sagan (SVK)	Cannondale	+ 44"
4	Michał Kwiatkowski (POL)	Omega Pharma–Quick-Step	+ 50"
5	Fabian Cancellara (SUI)	Trek Factory Racing	+ 1' 17"
6	Jurgen Van den Broeck (BEL)	Lotto–Belisol	+ 1' 45"
7	Tony Gallopin (FRA)	Lotto–Belisol	+ 1' 45"
8	Richie Porte (AUS)	Team Sky	+ 1' 54"
9	Andrew Talansky (USA)	Garmin–Sharp	+ 2' 05"
10	Alejandro Valverde (ESP)	Movistar Team	+ 2' 11"

== Stage 7 ==
11 July 2014 — Épernay to Nancy, 234.5 km (146 mi)

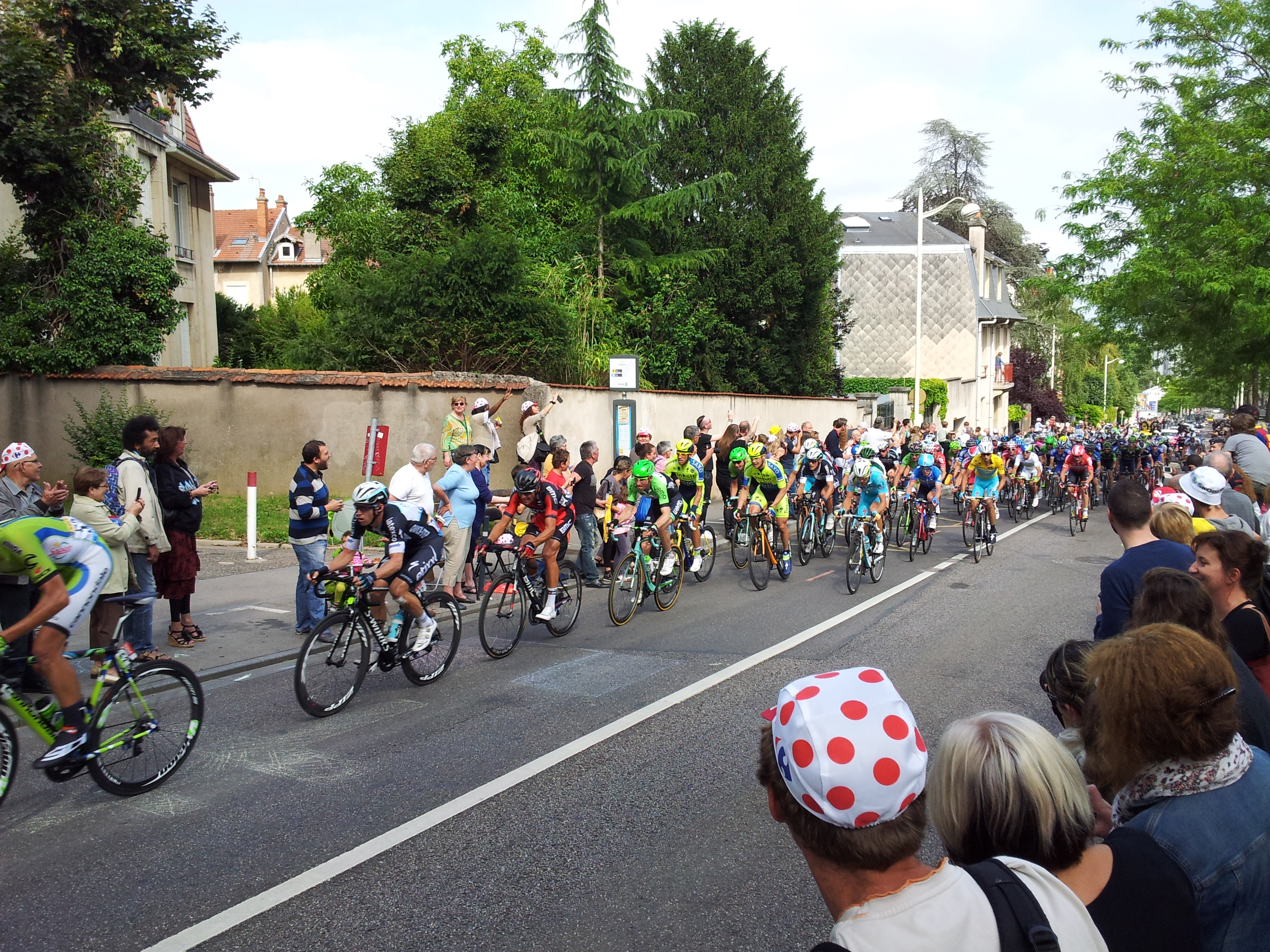
The peloton beginning the climb of the Côte de Boufflers

This long and undulating stage travelled through the departments of Marne, Meuse and Meurthe-et-Moselle. The stage departed from Épernay, with the race officially starting at Oiry. The route first headed east through Châlons-en-Champagne, Sainte-Menehould and Clermont-en-Argonne and continued on this course to Charny-sur-Meuse. The route then turned south-east just before travelling through Douaumont and then continued in this direction through Moulainville and Fresnes-en-Woëvre. An intermediate sprint took place at Hannonville-sous-les-Côtes and the south-easterly route continued through Bernécourt. The route turned east from Dommartin-lès-Toul and two Category 4 climbs came towards the end of the stage, these were the Côte de Maron and the Côte de Boufflers. The stage then finished in Nancy.

Stage 7 result

Rank	Rider	Team	Time
1	Matteo Trentin (ITA)	Omega Pharma–Quick-Step	5h 18' 39"
2	Peter Sagan (SVK)	Cannondale	+ 0"
3	Tony Gallopin (FRA)	Lotto–Belisol	+ 0"
4	Tom Dumoulin (NED)	Giant–Shimano	+ 0"
5	Simon Gerrans (AUS)	Orica–GreenEDGE	+ 0"
6	Daniel Oss (ITA)	BMC Racing Team	+ 0"
7	Cyril Gautier (FRA)	Team Europcar	+ 0"
8	Sylvain Chavanel (FRA)	IAM Cycling	+ 0"
9	Sep Vanmarcke (BEL)	Belkin Pro Cycling	+ 0"
10	Greg Van Avermaet (BEL)	BMC Racing Team	+ 0"

General classification after stage 7

Rank	Rider	Team	Time
1	Vincenzo Nibali (ITA)	Astana	29h 57' 04"
2	Jakob Fuglsang (DEN)	Astana	+ 2"
3	Peter Sagan (SVK)	Cannondale	+ 44"
4	Michał Kwiatkowski (POL)	Omega Pharma–Quick-Step	+ 50"
5	Jurgen Van den Broeck (BEL)	Lotto–Belisol	+ 1' 45"
6	Tony Gallopin (FRA)	Lotto–Belisol	+ 1' 45"
7	Richie Porte (AUS)	Team Sky	+ 1' 54"
8	Andrew Talansky (USA)	Garmin–Sharp	+ 2' 05"
9	Alejandro Valverde (ESP)	Movistar Team	+ 2' 11"
10	Romain Bardet (FRA)	Ag2r–La Mondiale	+ 2' 11"

== Stage 8 ==
12 July 2014 — Tomblaine to Gérardmer La Mauselaine, 161 km (100 mi)

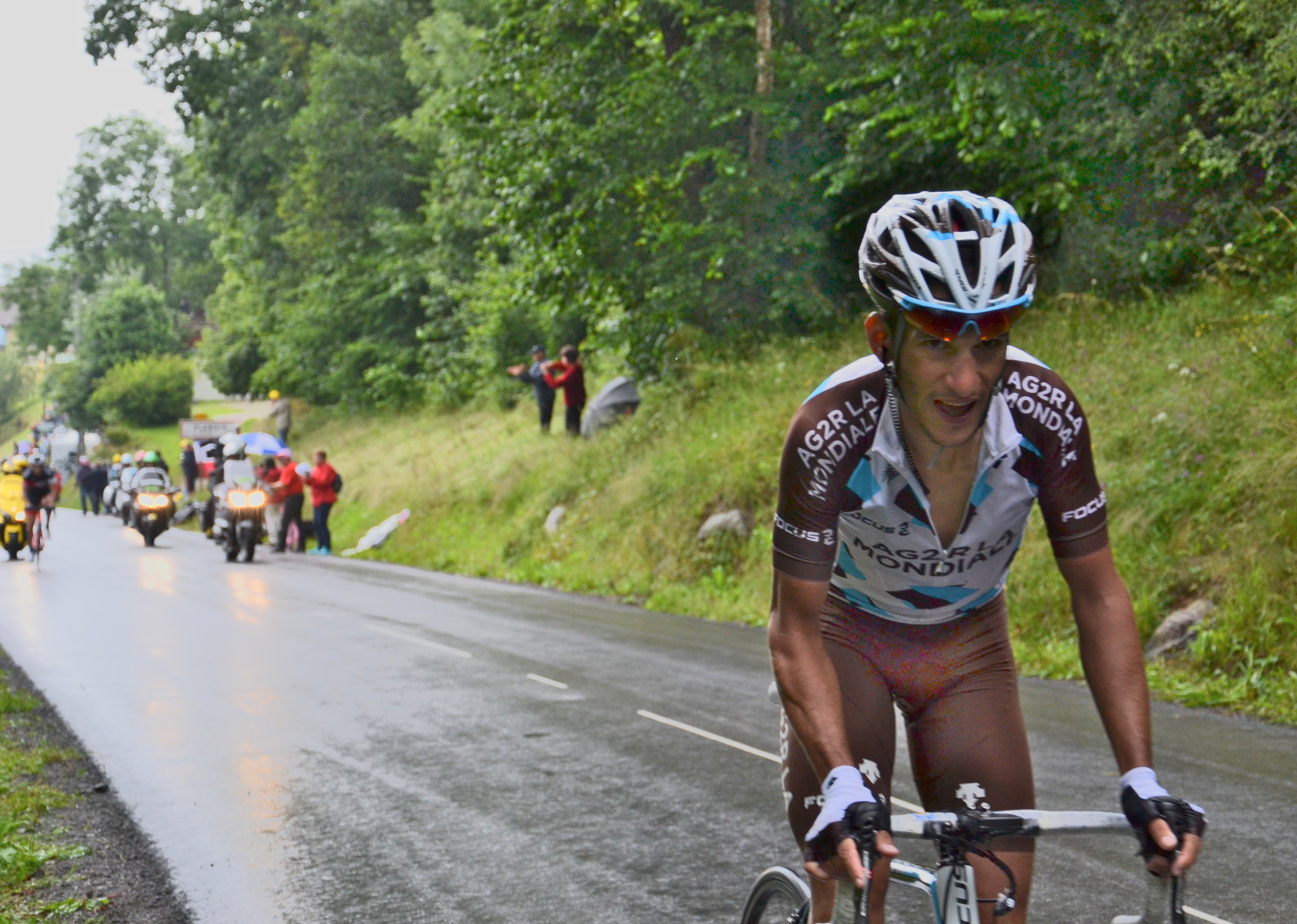
Blel Kadri leaves Sylvain Chavanel in the distance, on the climb of the col de la Croix des Moinats

The stage travelled through the departments of Meurthe-et-Moselle and Vosges. The stage had most of the route as undulating, with a mild climb. Towards the end, the stage entered low mountains.

This stage headed east out of the Tomblaine district of Nancy, and through Lunéville, before the route turned south towards Baccarat. The route continued south-west through Rambervillers to Épinal, followed by an intermediate sprint at Dinozé as the route turned east, once again, and followed the Moselle to Remiremont, Saint-Amé and Vagney. From Vagney, the race then went into the Vosges mountains with two Category 2 climbs, these being the Col de la Croix des Moinats, through La Bresse and over the Col de Grosse Pierre. The race then headed north into Gérardmer and up to the ski station of La Mauselaine.

Five riders were in the breakaway for the day. Sylvain Chavanel was the best climber in the breakaway. However, on the final climb Blel Kadri launched an attack which nobody was able to follow. Behind in the peloton Tinkoff–Saxo started chasing so that Alberto Contador could possibly win the stage. With 2 kilometres to go Blel Kadri had a 4-minute advantage over the peloton which would be enough for him to become the first French rider to win a stage of that Tour de France. As the peloton reached the final kilometre Contador made a number of attacks to try to gain time on Vincenzo Nibali and Richie Porte. He could only gain 3 seconds on Nibali and 7 on Porte. Critérium du Dauphiné winner Andrew Talansky of Garmin–Sharp crashed and finished 35th. He was over 4 and half minutes down in the overall standings in 16th place. Blel Kadri won the stage by over 2 minutes and also took charge of the King of the Mountains classification.

Stage 8 result

Rank	Rider	Team	Time
1	Blel Kadri (FRA)	Ag2r–La Mondiale	3h 49' 28"
2	Alberto Contador (ESP)	Tinkoff–Saxo	+ 2' 17"
3	Vincenzo Nibali (ITA)	Astana	+ 2' 20"
4	Richie Porte (AUS)	Team Sky	+ 2' 24"
5	Thibaut Pinot (FRA)	FDJ.fr	+ 2' 28"
6	Jean-Christophe Péraud (FRA)	Ag2r–La Mondiale	+ 2' 28"
7	Alejandro Valverde (ESP)	Movistar Team	+ 2' 36"
8	Tejay van Garderen (USA)	BMC Racing Team	+ 2' 40"
9	Romain Bardet (FRA)	Ag2r–La Mondiale	+ 2' 48"
10	Sylvain Chavanel (FRA)	IAM Cycling	+ 2' 54"

General classification after stage 8

Rank	Rider	Team	Time
1	Vincenzo Nibali (ITA)	Astana	33h 48' 52"
2	Jakob Fuglsang (DEN)	Astana	+ 1' 44"
3	Richie Porte (AUS)	Team Sky	+ 1' 58"
4	Michał Kwiatkowski (POL)	Omega Pharma–Quick-Step	+ 2' 26"
5	Alejandro Valverde (ESP)	Movistar Team	+ 2' 27"
6	Alberto Contador (ESP)	Tinkoff–Saxo	+ 2' 34"
7	Romain Bardet (FRA)	Ag2r–La Mondiale	+ 2' 39"
8	Rui Costa (POR)	Lampre–Merida	+ 2' 52"
9	Bauke Mollema (NED)	Belkin Pro Cycling	+ 3' 02"
10	Jurgen Van den Broeck (BEL)	Lotto–Belisol	+ 3' 02"

== Stage 9 ==
13 July 2014 — Gérardmer to Mulhouse, 170 km (106 mi)

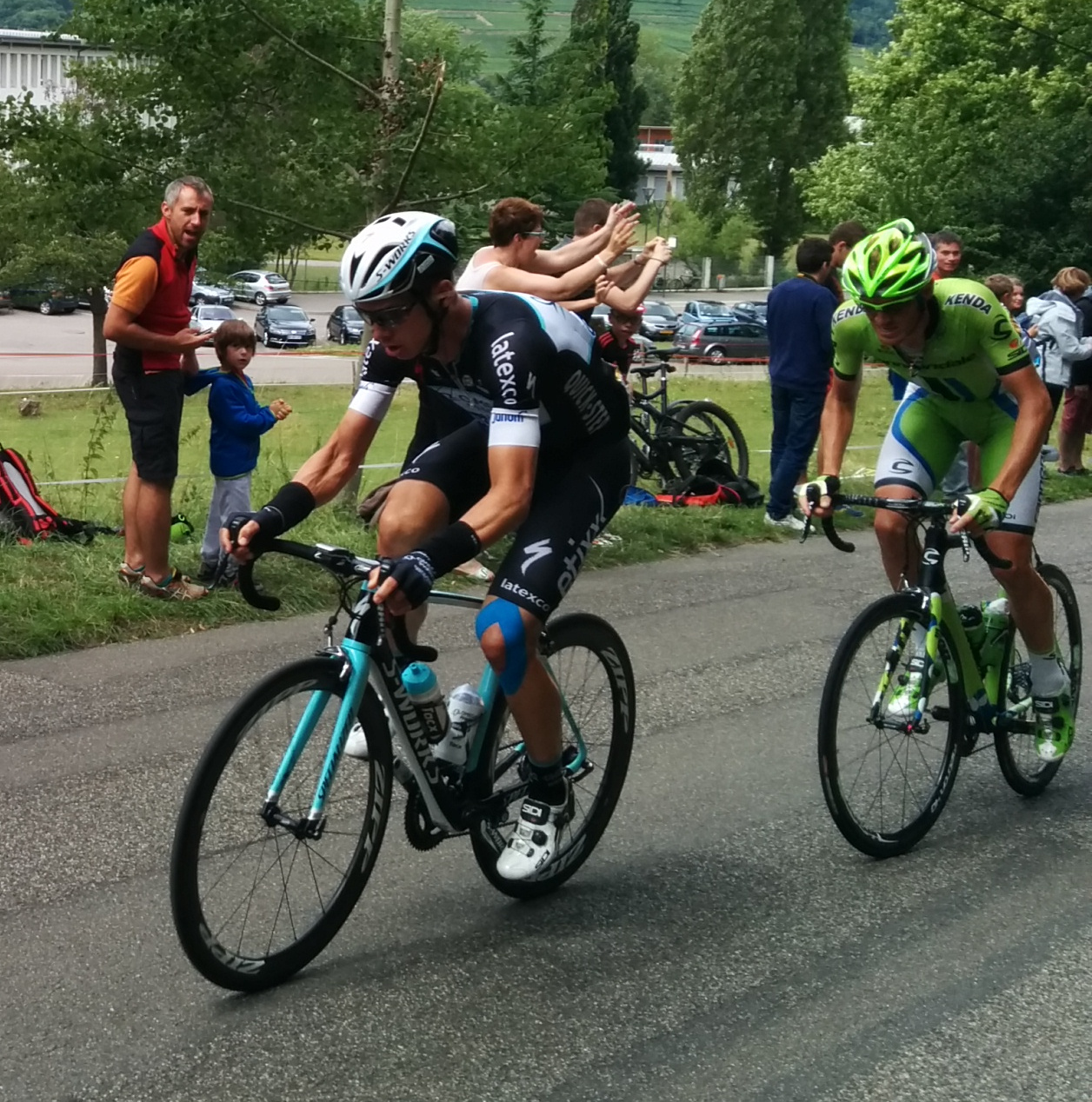
Stage winner Tony Martin (left) in the breakaway

This low mountain stage travelled from the department of Vosges, into Haut-Rhin. The stage departed from Gérardmer with racing officially starting between Gérardmer and Xonrupt-Longemer. The race headed east to the Category 2 Col de la Schlucht at 1,140 m (3,740 ft), and descended north-east into the valley floor, then south-east, towards the outskirts of Orbey. The route then began to climb the Category 3 Col du Wettstein at 880 m (2,887 ft) before a long 21 km (13 mi) descent east to the outskirts of Turckheim. From here, the route headed south and, once again, the road quickly rose to the Category 3 Côte des Cinq Châteaux at 560 m (1,837 ft), and was quickly followed by the Category 2 Côte de Gueberschwihr at 559 m (1,834 ft) before heading south-west. An intermediate sprint took place at Linthal, before heading west for the biggest climb of the day. The Category 1 Le Markstein at 1,183 m (3,881 ft) gave a 15 km (9 mi) ascent to the ski station, with the ascent continuing south-east into the Category 3 Le Grand Ballon at 1,336 m (4,383 ft). The route then took a fast 22 km (14 mi) descent continuing south-east into Cernay and Wittelsheim, through Pfastatt and finally finishing in Mulhouse.

Stage 9 result

Rank	Rider	Team	Time
1	Tony Martin (GER)	Omega Pharma–Quick-Step	4h 09' 34"
2	Fabian Cancellara (SUI)	Trek Factory Racing	+ 2' 45"
3	Greg Van Avermaet (BEL)	BMC Racing Team	+ 2' 45"
4	Tom Dumoulin (NED)	Giant–Shimano	+ 2' 45"
5	Matteo Montaguti (ITA)	Ag2r–La Mondiale	+ 2' 45"
6	José Joaquín Rojas (ESP)	Movistar Team	+ 2' 45"
7	Steven Kruijswijk (NED)	Belkin Pro Cycling	+ 2' 45"
8	Mikaël Cherel (FRA)	Ag2r–La Mondiale	+ 2' 45"
9	Brice Feillu (FRA)	Bretagne–Séché Environnement	+ 2' 45"
10	Tiago Machado (POR)	NetApp–Endura	+ 2' 45"

General classification after stage 9

Rank	Rider	Team	Time
1	Tony Gallopin (FRA)	Lotto–Belisol	38h 04' 38"
2	Vincenzo Nibali (ITA)	Astana	+ 1' 34"
3	Tiago Machado (POR)	NetApp–Endura	+ 2' 40"
4	Jakob Fuglsang (DEN)	Astana	+ 3' 18"
5	Richie Porte (AUS)	Team Sky	+ 3' 32"
6	Michał Kwiatkowski (POL)	Omega Pharma–Quick-Step	+ 4' 00"
7	Alejandro Valverde (ESP)	Movistar Team	+ 4' 01"
8	Pierre Rolland (FRA)	Team Europcar	+ 4' 07"
9	Alberto Contador (ESP)	Tinkoff–Saxo	+ 4' 08"
10	Romain Bardet (FRA)	Ag2r–La Mondiale	+ 4' 13"

== Stage 10 ==
14 July 2014 — Mulhouse to La Planche des Belles Filles, 161.5 km (100 mi)

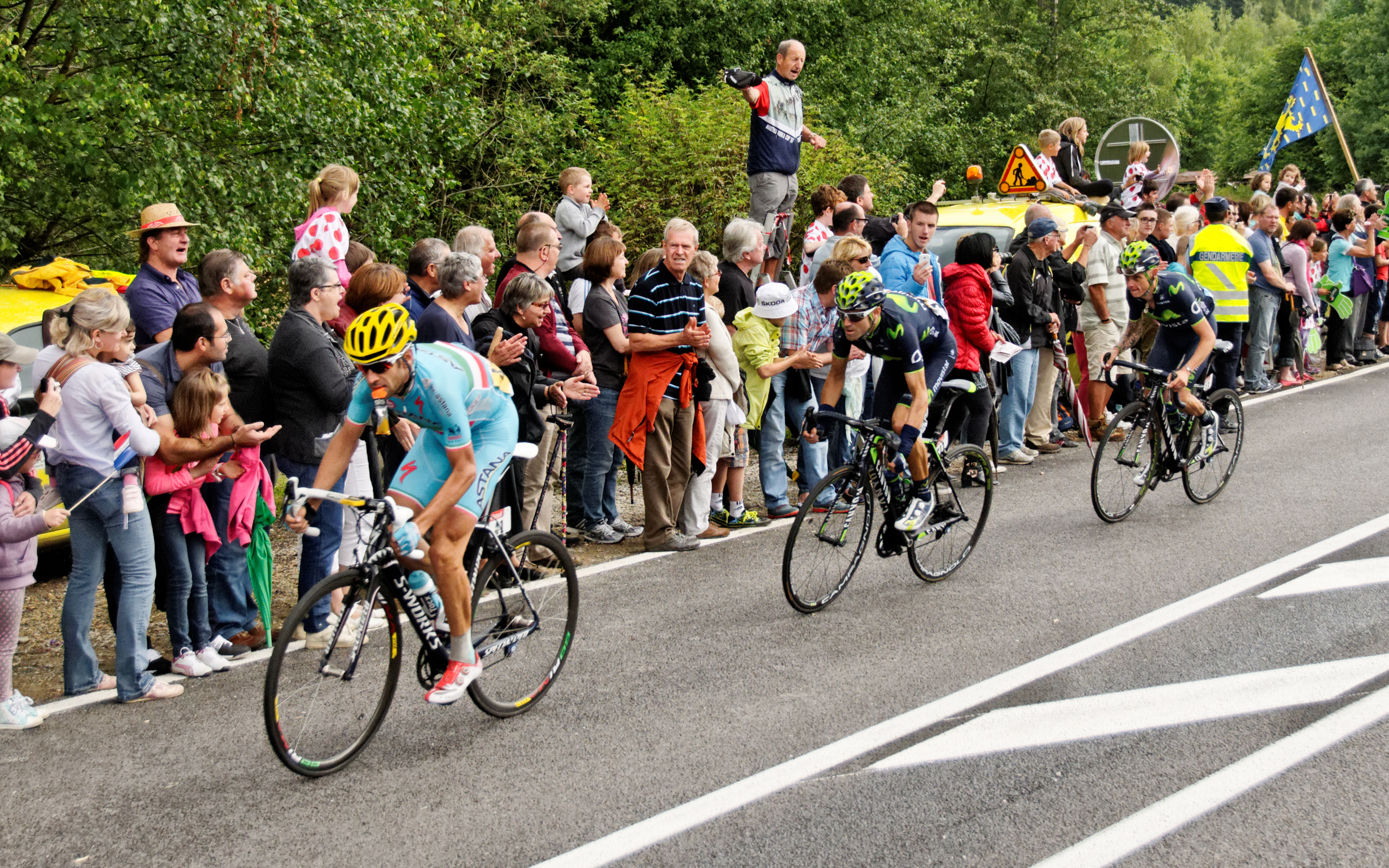
Stage winner Vincenzo Nibali, followed by two Movistar Team riders, before the final climb at Plancher-les-Mines

This mountainous stage set off from the department of Haut-Rhin, headed back into Vosges and finished in the department of Haute-Saône. The stage started at Mulhouse, with racing officially starting just north of Wittenheim. The route turned north-west at Ensisheim and zig-zagged from Raedersheim, through Gundolsheim to Soultzmatt. The race then began the ascent of the Category 2 Col du Firstplan at 722 m (2,369 ft) before descending to a sprint at Muhlele (Gunsbach). The race began to head west just before the sprint. This was rapidly followed by the race travelling through Munster. The route then turned to the south-west and traversed two Category 1 climbs. The first climb was the Petit Ballon at 1,163 m (3,816 ft) and then the Col du Platzerwasel at 1,193 m (3,914 ft). This was followed by a 21 km (13 mi) descent to Kruth. The route then continued over the Category 2 Col d'Oderen at 884 m (2,900 ft), the Category 3 Col des Croix at 678 m (2,224 ft) and the Category 1 Col des Chevrères at 914 m (2,999 ft). The race descended into Plancher-les-Mines before immediately beginning the Category 1 ascent to the finish at La Planche des Belles Filles, which was at 1,035 m (3,396 ft).

Stage 10 result

Rank	Rider	Team	Time
1	Vincenzo Nibali (ITA)	Astana	4h 27' 26"
2	Thibaut Pinot (FRA)	FDJ.fr	+ 15"
3	Alejandro Valverde (ESP)	Movistar Team	+ 20"
4	Jean-Christophe Péraud (FRA)	Ag2r–La Mondiale	+ 20"
5	Romain Bardet (FRA)	Ag2r–La Mondiale	+ 22"
6	Tejay van Garderen (USA)	BMC Racing Team	+ 22"
7	Richie Porte (AUS)	Team Sky	+ 25"
8	Leopold König (CZE)	NetApp–Endura	+ 50"
9	Joaquim Rodríguez (ESP)	Team Katusha	+ 52"
10	Mikel Nieve (ESP)	Team Sky	+ 54"

General classification after stage 10

Rank	Rider	Team	Time
1	Vincenzo Nibali (ITA)	Astana	42h 33' 38"
2	Richie Porte (AUS)	Team Sky	+ 2' 23"
3	Alejandro Valverde (ESP)	Movistar Team	+ 2' 47"
4	Romain Bardet (FRA)	Ag2r–La Mondiale	+ 3' 01"
5	Tony Gallopin (FRA)	Lotto–Belisol	+ 3' 12"
6	Thibaut Pinot (FRA)	FDJ.fr	+ 3' 47"
7	Tejay van Garderen (USA)	BMC Racing Team	+ 3' 56"
8	Jean-Christophe Péraud (FRA)	Ag2r–La Mondiale	+ 3' 57"
9	Rui Costa (POR)	Lampre–Merida	+ 3' 58"
10	Bauke Mollema (NED)	Belkin Pro Cycling	+ 4' 08"

== Stage 11 ==
16 July 2014 — Besançon to Oyonnax, 187.5 km (117 mi)

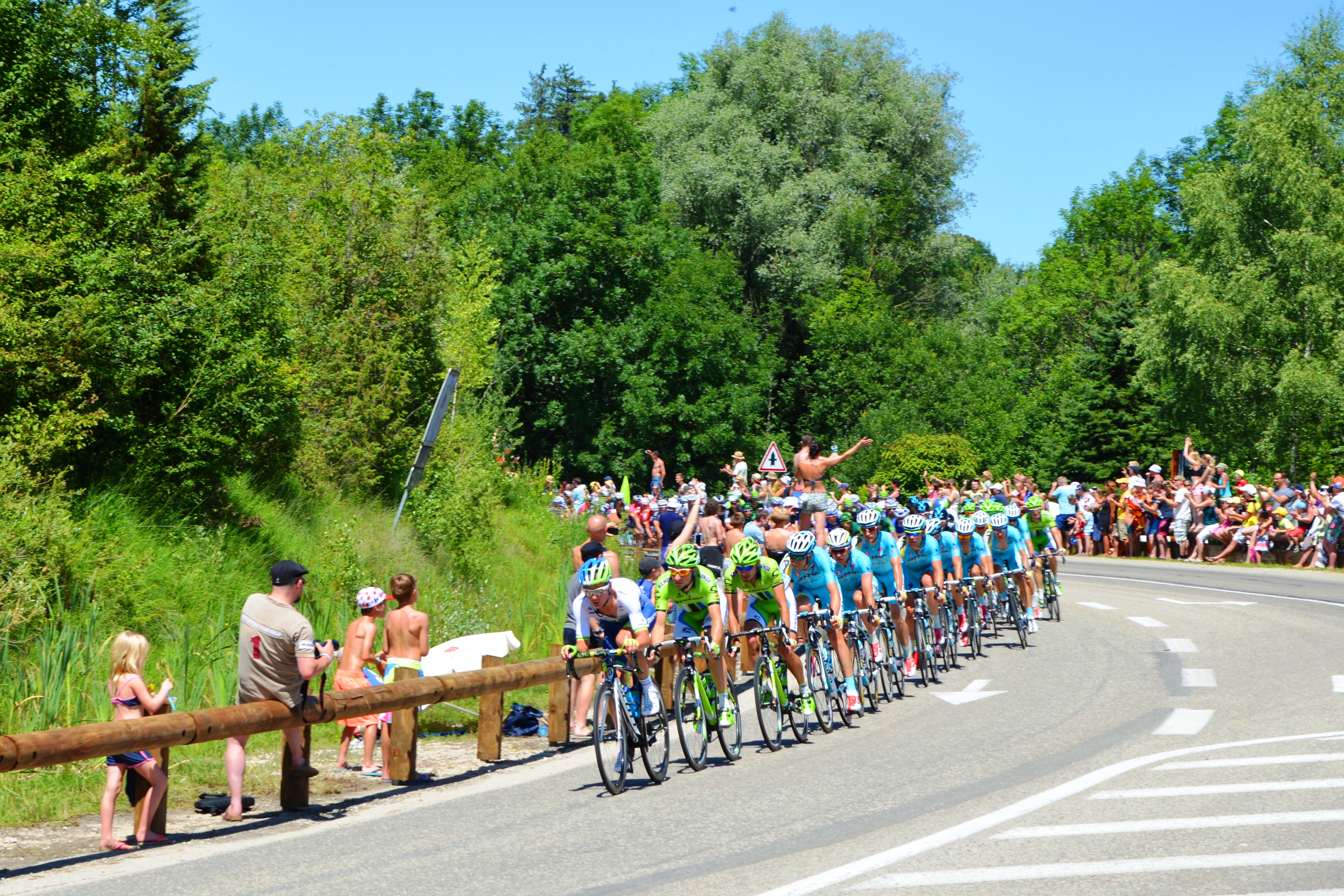
Peloton near Lac de Chalain

After the rest day in Besançon, this low mountain stage began in the department of Doubs, headed into Jura and finished in Ain. The stage departed from Besançon and had its racing officially starting just south-west of Avanne-Aveney. The route headed south-west to Arc-et-Senans and then turned south through Chamblay, Arbois, Montrond and Pont-du-Navoy to an intermediate sprint at Charcier. The southerly route then continued through Les Crozets and Chassal before entering the Jura Mountains. The first climb of the day was the Category 3 climb of the Côte de Rogna at 766 m (2,513 ft), and then into the Category 3 climb of the Côte de Choux at 834 m (2,736 ft), which followed immediately into the Category 4 climb of the Côte de Désertin. There was then an approximate 10 km (6 mi) descent before the climb of the Côte d'Échallon at 969 m (3,179 ft). The stage finished with a 19 km (12 mi) descent to Oyonnax.

Stage 11 result

Rank	Rider	Team	Time
1	Tony Gallopin (FRA)	Lotto–Belisol	4h 25' 45"
2	John Degenkolb (GER)	Giant–Shimano	+ 0"
3	Matteo Trentin (ITA)	Omega Pharma–Quick-Step	+ 0"
4	Daniele Bennati (ITA)	Tinkoff–Saxo	+ 0"
5	Simon Gerrans (AUS)	Orica–GreenEDGE	+ 0"
6	José Joaquín Rojas (ESP)	Movistar Team	+ 0"
7	Greg Van Avermaet (BEL)	BMC Racing Team	+ 0"
8	Samuel Dumoulin (FRA)	Ag2r–La Mondiale	+ 0"
9	Peter Sagan (SVK)	Cannondale	+ 0"
10	Kévin Reza (FRA)	Team Europcar	+ 0"

General classification after stage 11

Rank	Rider	Team	Time
1	Vincenzo Nibali (ITA)	Astana	46h 59' 23"
2	Richie Porte (AUS)	Team Sky	+ 2' 23"
3	Alejandro Valverde (ESP)	Movistar Team	+ 2' 47"
4	Romain Bardet (FRA)	Ag2r–La Mondiale	+ 3' 01"
5	Tony Gallopin (FRA)	Lotto–Belisol	+ 3' 12"
6	Thibaut Pinot (FRA)	FDJ.fr	+ 3' 47"
7	Tejay van Garderen (USA)	BMC Racing Team	+ 3' 56"
8	Jean-Christophe Péraud (FRA)	Ag2r–La Mondiale	+ 3' 57"
9	Bauke Mollema (NED)	Belkin Pro Cycling	+ 4' 08"
10	Jurgen Van den Broeck (BEL)	Lotto–Belisol	+ 4' 18"
