= De Fresne =

de Fresne, DeFrense, de-fresne or variant, may refer to:

- Fresne
  - du Fresne
  - le Fresne
- Chevalier de Fresne (Knight of Fresne)
  - Camille Charles Leclerc, chevalier de Fresne
- Seigneur de Fresne (Lord of Fresne)
  - Florimond II Robertet, seigneur de Fresne
