= Defrasne =

Defrasne is a surname. Notable people with the surname include:

- Alain Djeumfa Defrasne (born 1972), Cameroonian football manager
- Vincent Defrasne (born 1977), French biathlete

== See also ==
- Dufresne
