= Fresnes =

Fresnes may refer to the following places in France:

- Fresnes, Côte-d'Or, in the Côte-d'Or département
- Fresnes, Loir-et-Cher, in the Loir-et-Cher département
- Fresnes, Yonne, in the Yonne département
- Fresnes, Val-de-Marne, in the Val-de-Marne département
- Fresnes-au-Mont, in the Meuse département
- Fresnes-en-Saulnois, in the Moselle département
- Fresnes-en-Tardenois, in the Aisne département
- Fresnes-en-Woëvre, in the Meuse département
- Fresnes-lès-Montauban, in the Pas-de-Calais département
- Fresnes-Mazancourt, in the Somme département
- Fresnes-sous-Coucy, in the Aisne département
- Fresnes-sur-Apance, in the Haute-Marne département
- Fresnes-sur-Escaut, in the Nord département
- Fresnes-sur-Marne, in the Seine-et-Marne département
- Fresnes-Tilloloy, in the Somme département

== See also ==
- Fresnes Prison
- Fresne (disambiguation)
