= Servance-Miellin =

- Commune
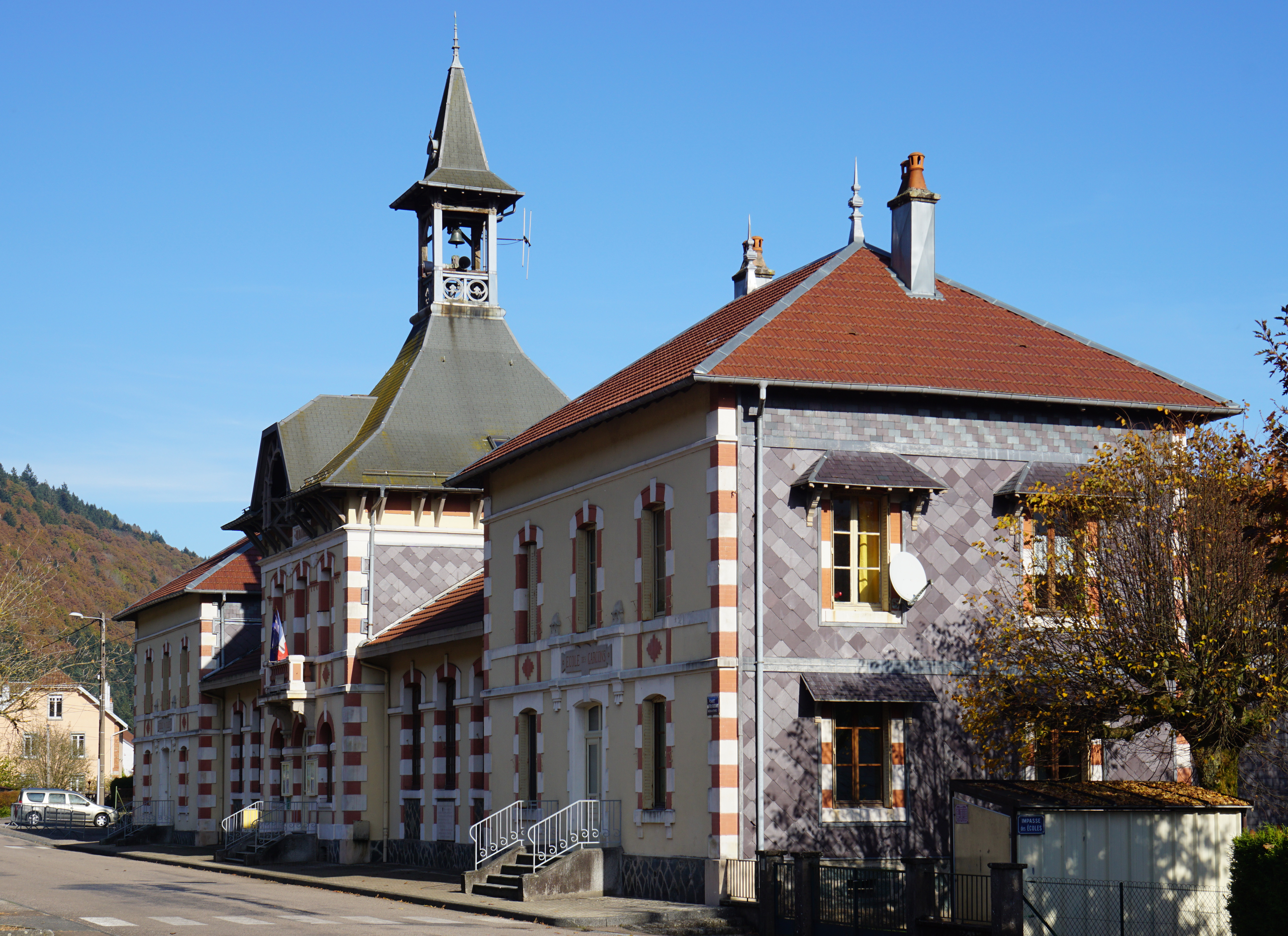
- The town hall in Servance
- Location of Servance-Miellin
- Location within France Location within Bourgogne-Franche-Comté
- Coordinates: 47°48′54″N 6°40′59″E
- Country: France
- Region: Bourgogne-Franche-Comté
- Department: Haute-Saône
- Arrondissement: Lure
- Canton: Mélisey
- Intercommunality: Mille étangs

Government
  - Mayor (2020–2026): Henri Saintigny
- Area^{1}: 52.60 km^{2} (20.31 sq mi)
- Population (2023): 759
  - Density: 14.4/km^{2} (37.4/sq mi)
- Time zone: UTC+01:00 (CET)
  - Summer (DST): UTC+02:00 (CEST)
- INSEE/Postal code: 70489 /70440
- ^{1} French Land Register data, which excludes lakes, ponds, glaciers > 1 km^{2} (0.386 sq mi or 247 acres) and river estuaries.

Servance-Miellin (French pronunciation: [sɛʁvɑ̃s mjɛlɛ̃]) is a commune in the department of Haute-Saône, eastern France. The municipality was established on 1 January 2017 by merger of the former communes of Servance (the seat) and Miellin.

== See also ==
- Communes of the Haute-Saône department
