= Bourgogne-Fresne =

- Commune
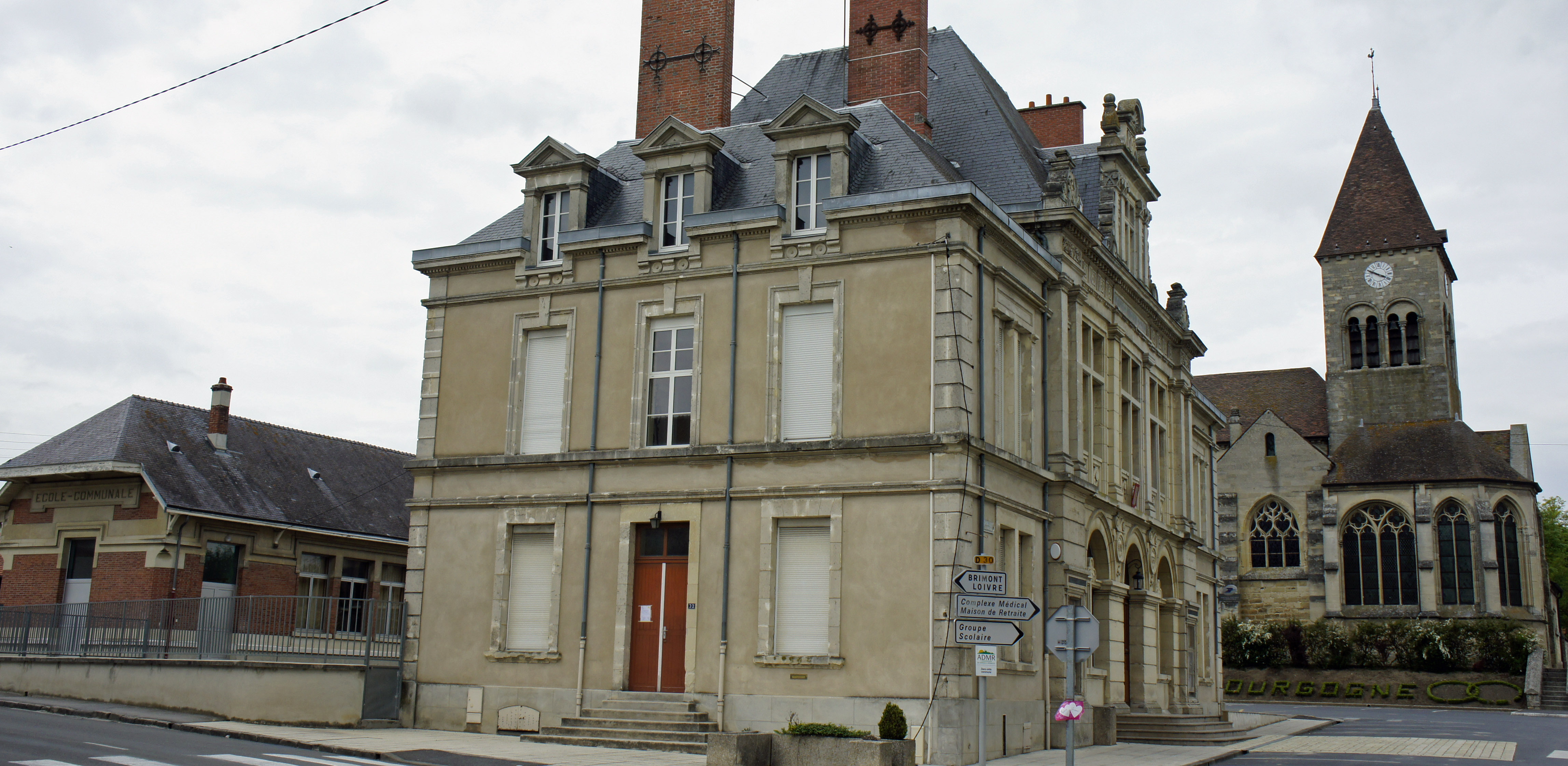
- The town hall, school and church in Bourgogne
- Location of Bourgogne-Fresne
- Location within France Location within Grand Est
- Coordinates: 49°21′00″N 4°04′19″E
- Country: France
- Region: Grand Est
- Department: Marne
- Arrondissement: Reims
- Canton: Bourgogne-Fresne
- Intercommunality: CU Grand Reims
- Area^{1}: 26.84 km^{2} (10.36 sq mi)
- Population (2023): 1,477
  - Density: 55.03/km^{2} (142.5/sq mi)
- Time zone: UTC+01:00 (CET)
  - Summer (DST): UTC+02:00 (CEST)
- INSEE/Postal code: 51075 /51110
- ^{1} French Land Register data, which excludes lakes, ponds, glaciers > 1 km^{2} (0.386 sq mi or 247 acres) and river estuaries.

Bourgogne-Fresne (French pronunciation: [buʁɡɔɲ fʁɛn]) is a commune in the department of Marne, northeastern France. The municipality was established on 1 January 2017 by merger of the former communes of Bourgogne (the seat) and Fresne-lès-Reims.

== Geography ==
Bourgogne-Fresne lies approximately ten kilometers north-northeast of Reims. The Suippe River borders the municipality to the north. Bourgogne-Fresne is surrounded by the neighboring municipalities of Auménancourt and Saint-Étienne-sur-Suippe to the north, Boult-sur-Suippe to the northeast, Pomacle to the east, Witry-lès-Reims and Bétheny to the south, and Brimont to the west and southwest.

== See also ==
- Communes of the Marne department
