= Château du Fresne-Camilly =

Château in Calvados, Normandy, France

- Château de Camilly
- Le Fresne-Camilly in France
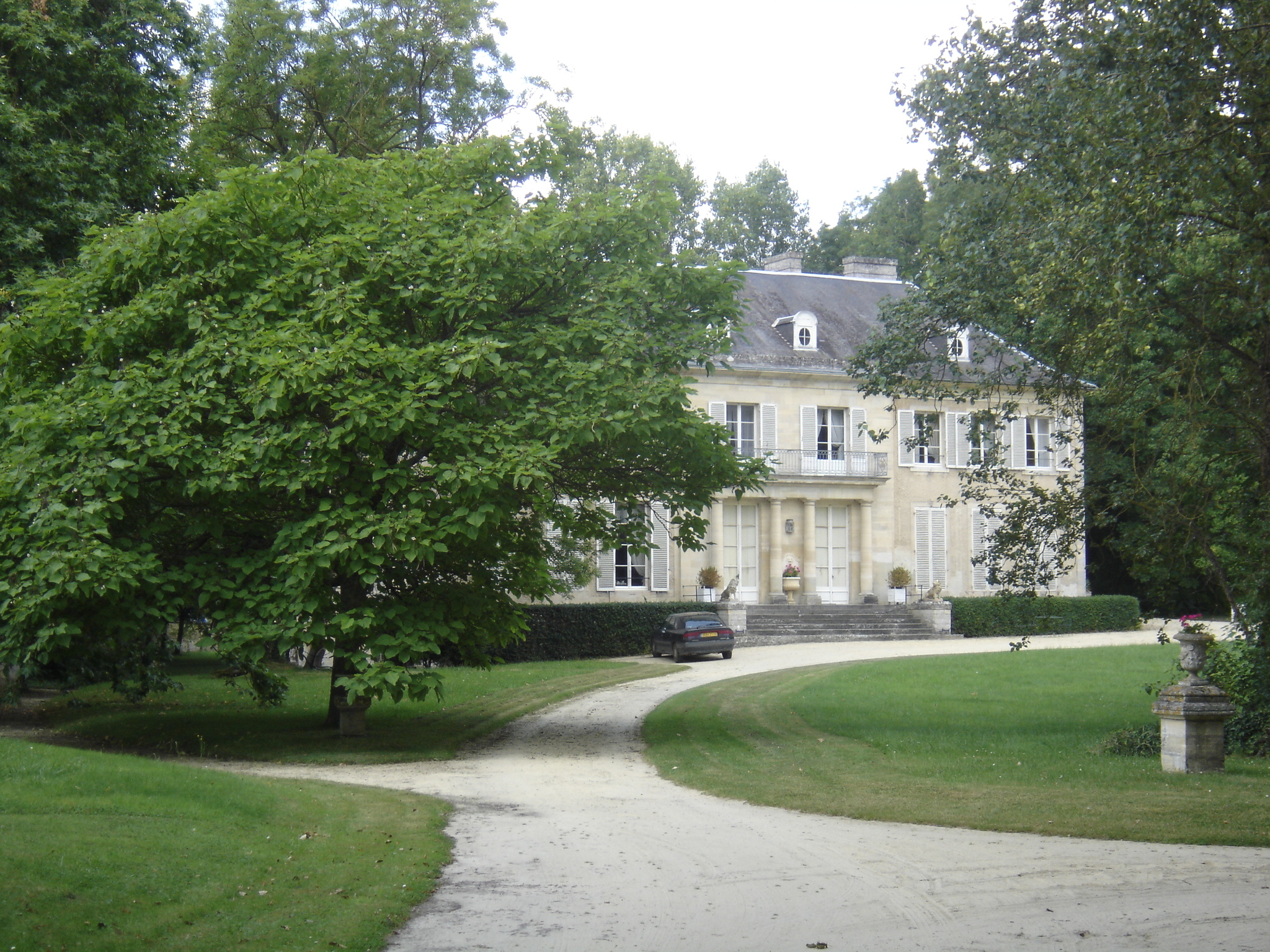

Site information
- Owner: Privately owned

Site history
- Built: 17th and 19th centuries

The château's location in France.

The Château du Fresne-Camilly is a château located in the municipality of Le Fresne-Camilly in the French department of Calvados.

== History ==
It was built in the first half of the 17th century for the Blouet family of Camilly, and replaced a medieval building. It was burnt down during the French Revolution in 1792 but was rebuilt at the beginning of the 19th century for Count Leforestier d'Osseville.

== Architecture ==
The building is built in Creully Limestone. The dovecote, chapel, cellars and moats are all older than the current 19th-century building. The dovecote has lost its roof but is still well preserved.
