= Fresne-lès-Reims =

- Part of Bourgogne-Fresne
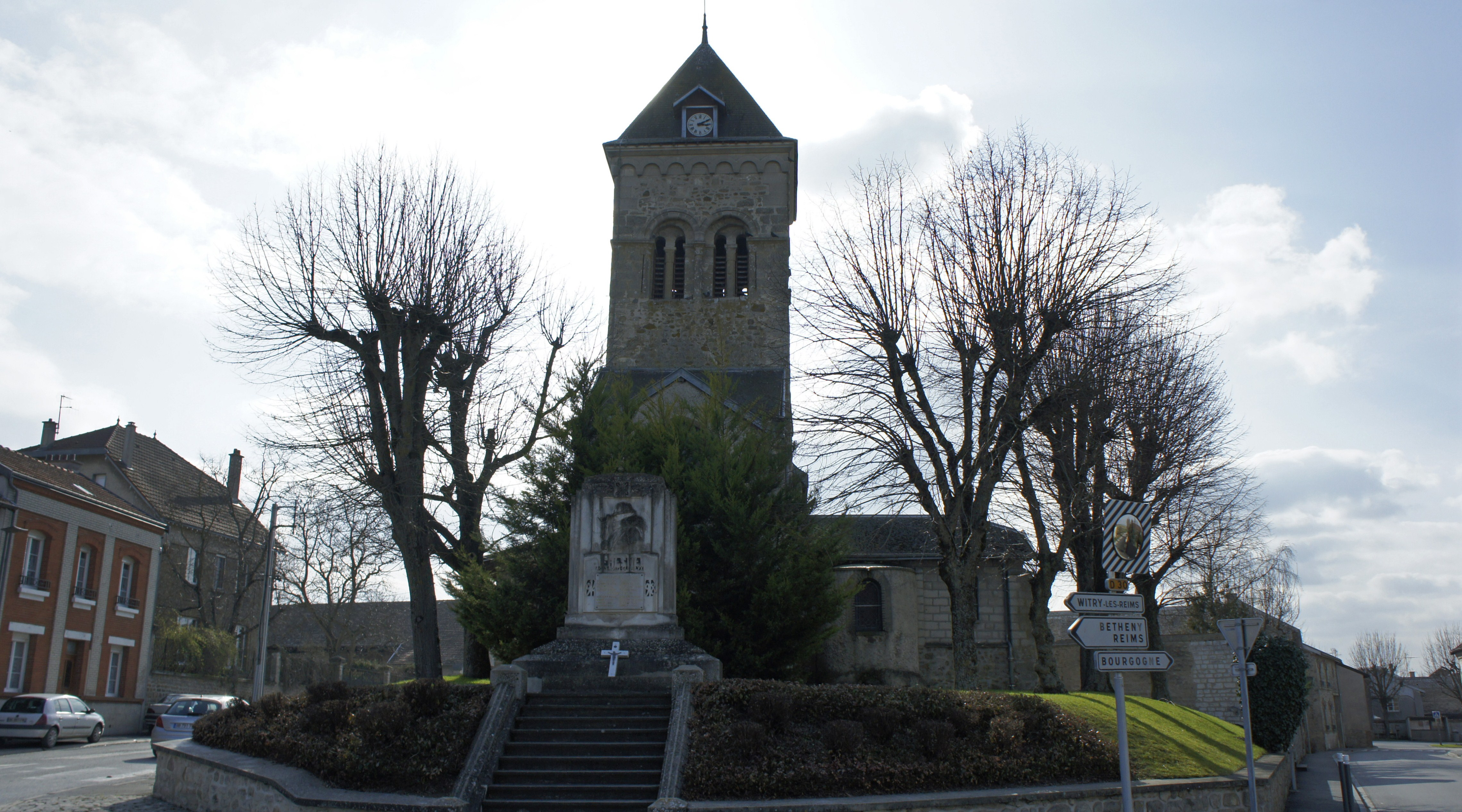
- Location of Fresne-lès-Reims
- Location within France Location within Grand Est
- Coordinates: 49°20′20″N 4°05′57″E
- Country: France
- Region: Grand Est
- Department: Marne
- Arrondissement: Reims
- Canton: Bourgogne-Fresne
- Commune: Bourgogne-Fresne
- Area^{1}: 12.46 km^{2} (4.81 sq mi)
- Elevation: 95 m (312 ft)
- Population (2022): 435
  - Density: 34.9/km^{2} (90.4/sq mi)
- Time zone: UTC+01:00 (CET)
  - Summer (DST): UTC+02:00 (CEST)
- Postal code: 51110
- ^{1} French Land Register data, which excludes lakes, ponds, glaciers > 1 km^{2} (0.386 sq mi or 247 acres) and river estuaries.

Fresne-lès-Reims (French pronunciation: [fʁɛn lɛ ʁɛ̃s], literally Fresne near Reims) is a former commune in the Marne department in north-eastern France. On 1 January 2017, it was merged into the new commune Bourgogne-Fresne.

== See also ==
- Communes of the Marne department
