= Servance =

Commune in Haute-Saône, France

- Part of Servance-Miellin
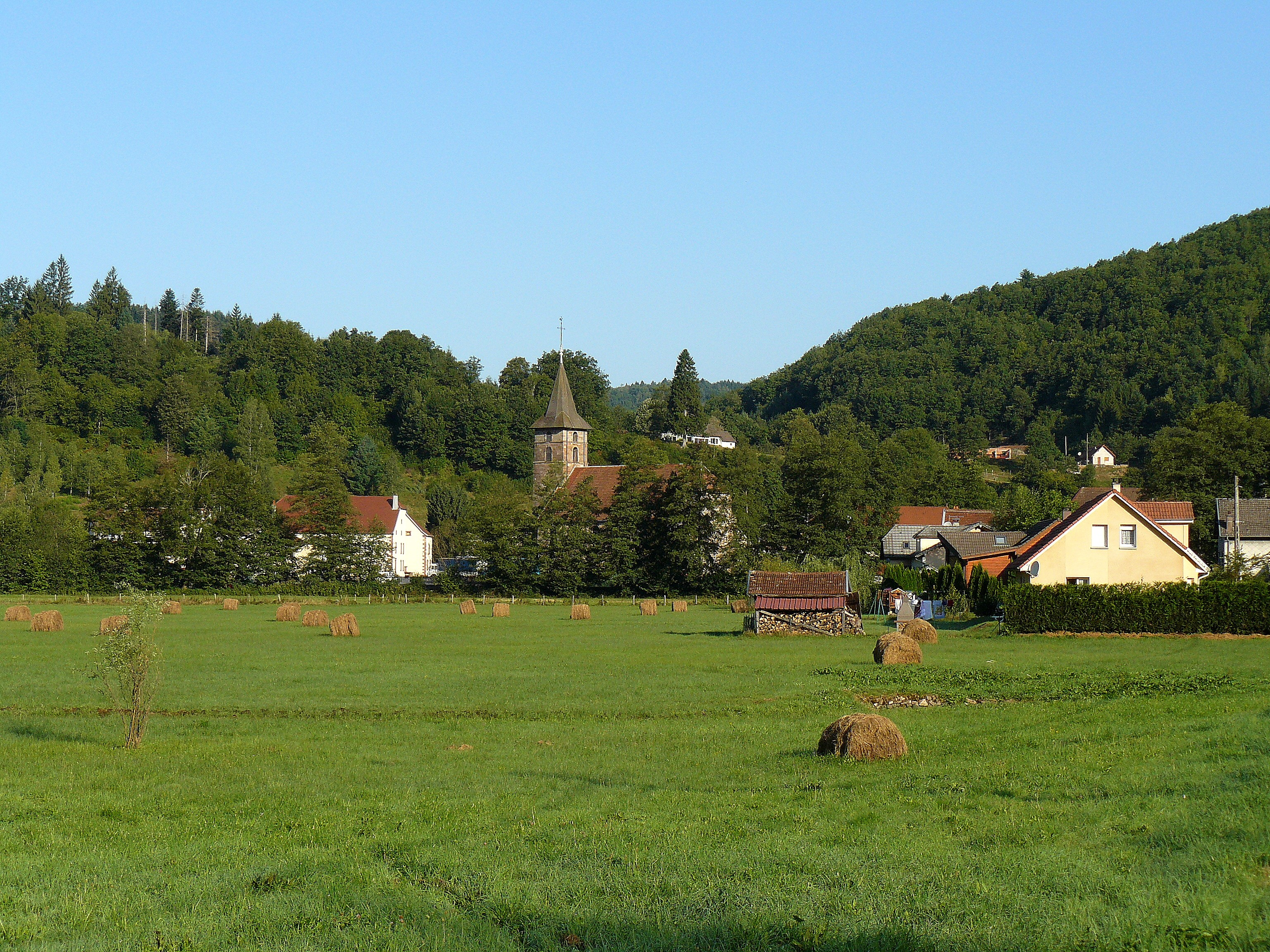

- Coat of arms
- Location of Servance
- Location within France Location within Bourgogne-Franche-Comté
- Coordinates: 47°48′55″N 6°40′59″E
- Country: France
- Region: Bourgogne-Franche-Comté
- Department: Haute-Saône
- Arrondissement: Lure
- Canton: Mélisey
- Commune: Servance-Miellin
- Area^{1}: 39.24 km^{2} (15.15 sq mi)
- Highest elevation: 932 m (3,058 ft)
- Lowest elevation: 380 m (1,250 ft)
- Population (2022): 702
  - Density: 17.9/km^{2} (46.3/sq mi)
- Time zone: UTC+01:00 (CET)
  - Summer (DST): UTC+02:00 (CEST)
- Postal code: 70440
- ^{1} French Land Register data, which excludes lakes, ponds, glaciers > 1 km^{2} (0.386 sq mi or 247 acres) and river estuaries.

Servance (French pronunciation: [sɛʁvɑ̃s]) is a former commune in the Haute-Saône department in the region of Bourgogne-Franche-Comté in eastern France. On 1 January 2017, it was merged into the new commune Servance-Miellin.

== See also ==
- Communes of the Haute-Saône department
