= Bourgogne, Marne =

Bourgogne
- Part of Bourgogne-Fresne
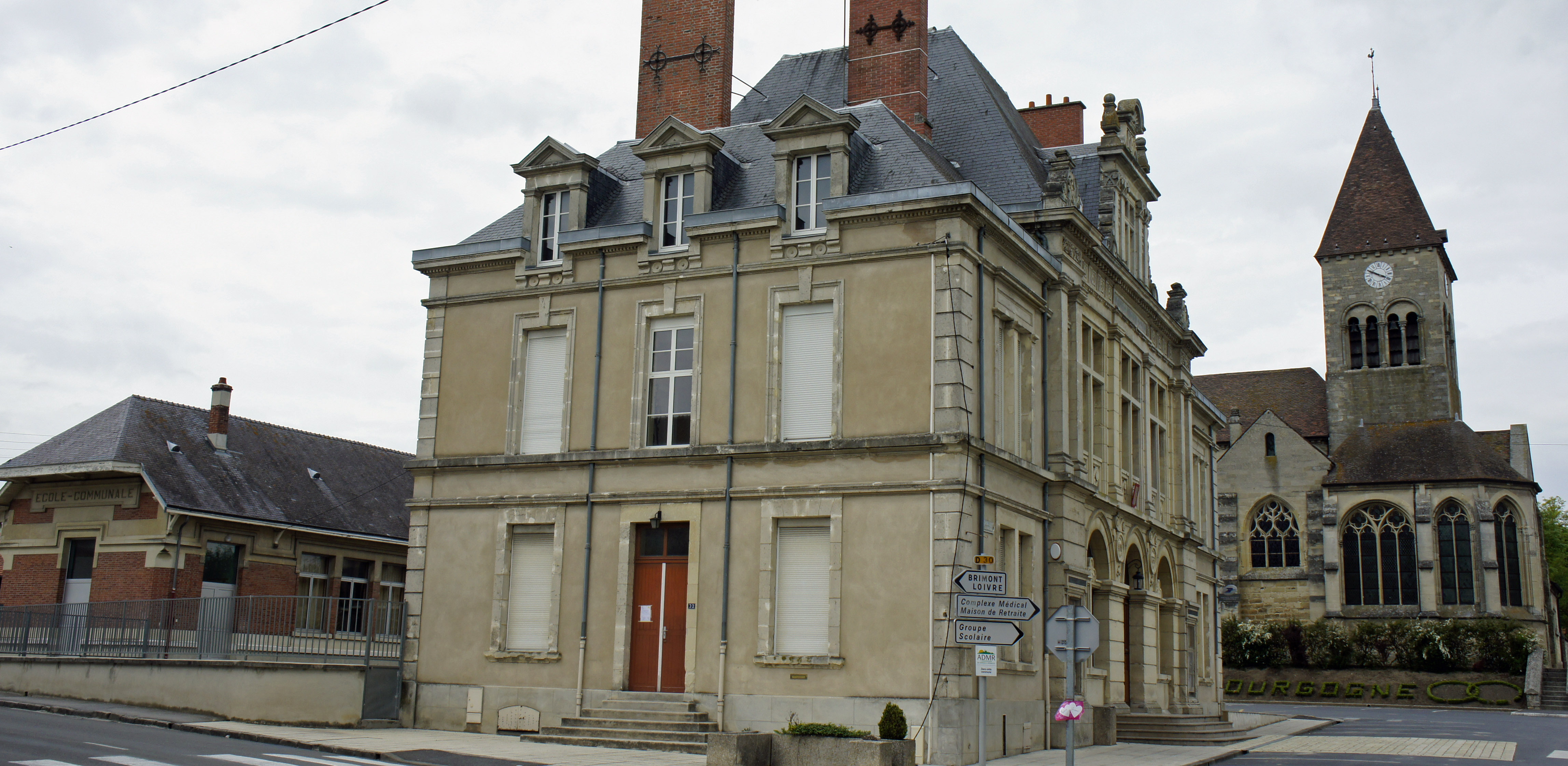
- The school, the town hall and the church

- Coat of arms
- Location of Bourgogne
- Location within France Location within Grand Est
- Coordinates: 49°21′00″N 4°04′20″E
- Country: France
- Region: Grand Est
- Department: Marne
- Arrondissement: Reims
- Canton: Bourgogne-Fresne
- Commune: Bourgogne-Fresne
- Area^{1}: 14.38 km^{2} (5.55 sq mi)
- Elevation: 90 m (300 ft)
- Population (2022): 1,019
  - Density: 70.86/km^{2} (183.5/sq mi)
- Time zone: UTC+01:00 (CET)
  - Summer (DST): UTC+02:00 (CEST)
- Postal code: 51110
- ^{1} French Land Register data, which excludes lakes, ponds, glaciers > 1 km^{2} (0.386 sq mi or 247 acres) and river estuaries.

Bourgogne (French pronunciation: [buʁɡɔɲ]) is a former commune of the Marne department in northeastern France. On 1 January 2017, it was merged into the new commune Bourgogne-Fresne.

== Geography ==
The commune is traversed by the Suippe river.

== Population ==
Historical population
Year	Pop.	±% p.a.
1962	585	—
1968	585	+0.00%
1975	698	+2.56%
1982	697	−0.02%
1990	858	+2.63%
1999	888	+0.38%
2006	994	+1.62%
2022	1,019	+0.16%
Source: EHESS and INSEE

== See also ==
- Communes of the Marne department
