= Chamblay =

Commune in Bourgogne-Franche-Comté, France

- Commune
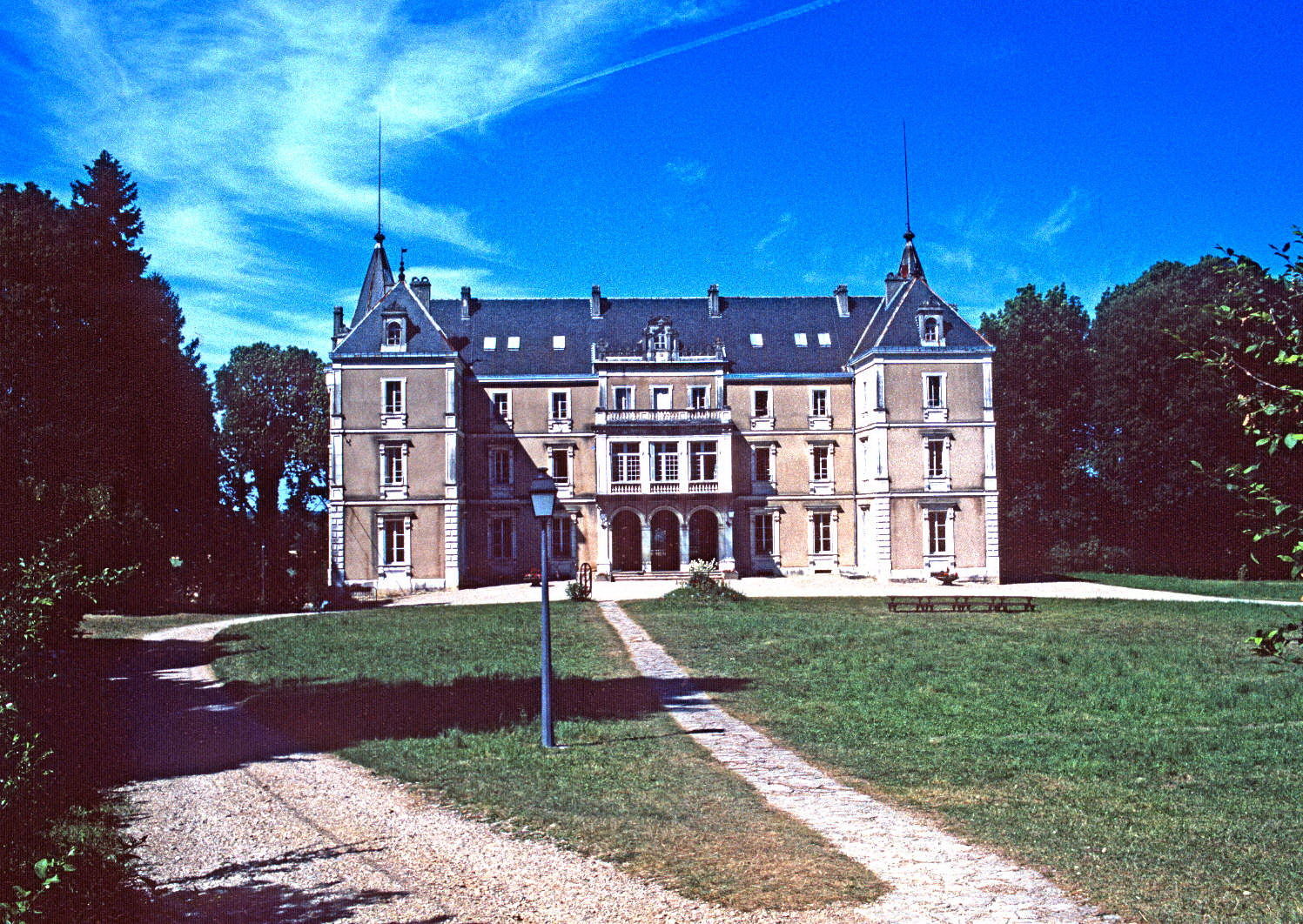
- Château de Clervans
- Location of Chamblay
- Location within France Location within Bourgogne-Franche-Comté
- Coordinates: 46°59′55″N 5°42′17″E
- Country: France
- Region: Bourgogne-Franche-Comté
- Department: Jura
- Arrondissement: Dole
- Canton: Mont-sous-Vaudrey

Government
  - Mayor (2020–2026): Philippe Brochet
- Area^{1}: 13.82 km^{2} (5.34 sq mi)
- Highest elevation: 268 m (879 ft)
- Lowest elevation: 219 m (719 ft)
- Population (2023): 423
  - Density: 30.6/km^{2} (79.3/sq mi)
- Time zone: UTC+01:00 (CET)
  - Summer (DST): UTC+02:00 (CEST)
- INSEE/Postal code: 39093 /39380
- ^{1} French Land Register data, which excludes lakes, ponds, glaciers > 1 km^{2} (0.386 sq mi or 247 acres) and river estuaries.

Chamblay (French pronunciation: [ʃɑ̃blɛ]) is a commune in the Jura department in Bourgogne-Franche-Comté in eastern France.

The village lies on the river Loue, about 20 km southeast of Dole and 35 km southwest of Besançon.

== Population ==
Historical population
Year	Pop.	±% p.a.
1968	351	—
1975	373	+0.87%
1982	337	−1.44%
1990	354	+0.62%
1999	388	+1.02%
2007	409	+0.66%
2012	422	+0.63%
2017	424	+0.09%
2023	423	−0.04%
Source: INSEE

== Sights ==
The Château de Clairvans is the major landmark in Chamblay. The château which is now a hotel was restored by Emine Karam in the 1920s.

== See also ==
- Communes of the Jura department
