= Le Fresne-Camilly =

- Commune
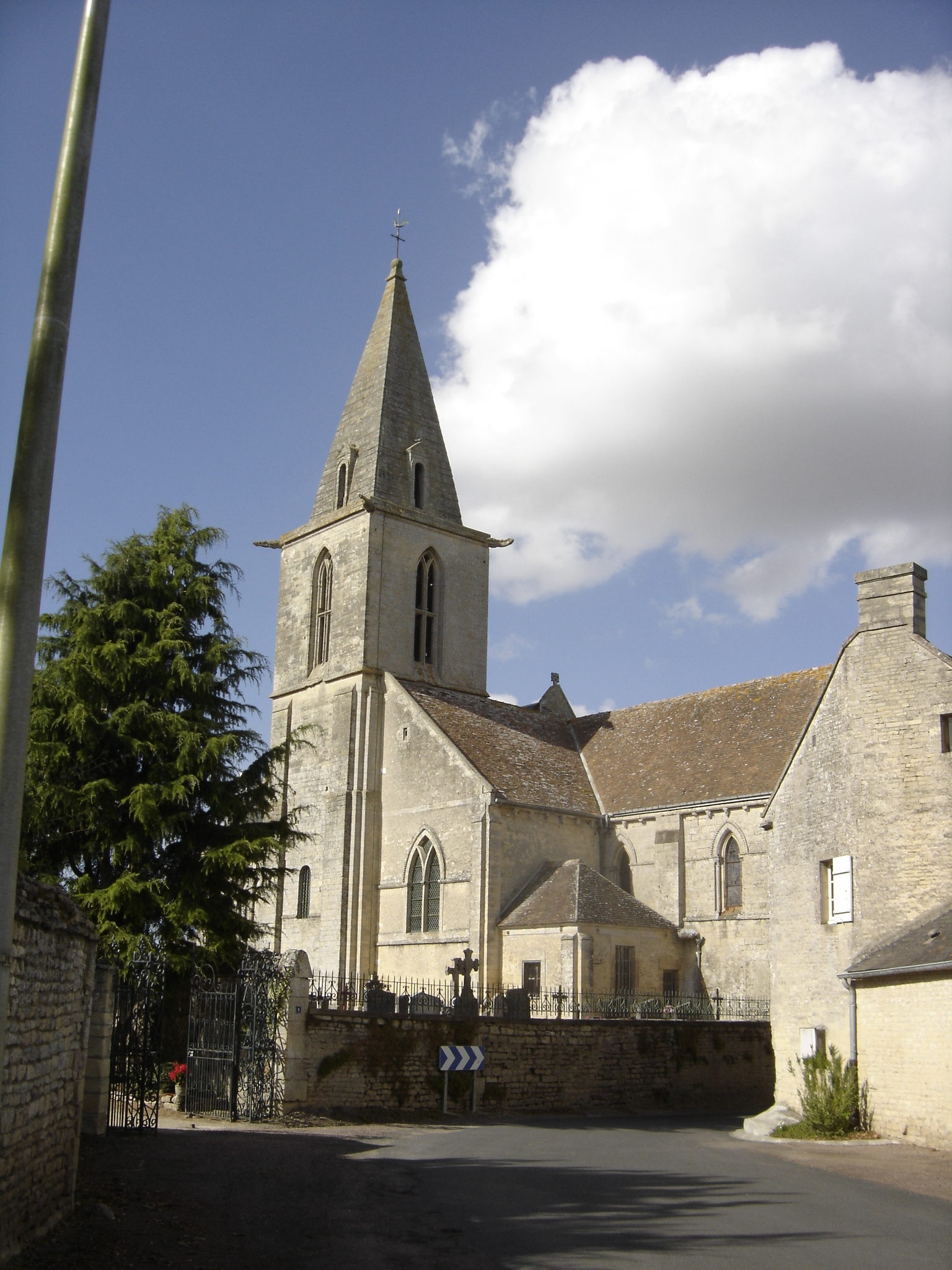
- The church in Le Fresne-Camilly
- Location of Le Fresne-Camilly
- Location within France Location within Normandy
- Coordinates: 49°15′40″N 0°29′11″W
- Country: France
- Region: Normandy
- Department: Calvados
- Arrondissement: Caen
- Canton: Thue et Mue
- Intercommunality: CU Caen la Mer

Government
  - Mayor (2020–2026): Jacques Landemaine
- Area^{1}: 7.06 km^{2} (2.73 sq mi)
- Elevation: 80 m (260 ft)
- Highest elevation: 59 m (194 ft)
- Lowest elevation: 19 m (62 ft)
- Population (2023): 951
  - Density: 135/km^{2} (349/sq mi)
- Time zone: UTC+01:00 (CET)
  - Summer (DST): UTC+02:00 (CEST)
- INSEE/Postal code: 14288 /14480
- ^{1} French Land Register data, which excludes lakes, ponds, glaciers > 1 km^{2} (0.386 sq mi or 247 acres) and river estuaries.

Le Fresne-Camilly (French pronunciation: [lə fʁɛn kamiji]) is a commune in the Calvados department in the Normandy region in northwestern France. It is home to the Château du Fresne-Camilly.

== Population ==
Historical population
Year	Pop.	±% p.a.
1968	434	—
1975	464	+0.96%
1982	685	+5.72%
1990	696	+0.20%
1999	787	+1.37%
2007	819	+0.50%
2012	800	−0.47%
2017	900	+2.38%
2023	951	+0.92%
Source: INSEE

== See also ==
- Communes of the Calvados department
