= Dufresne =

Dufresne or du Fresne (French pronunciation: [dyfʁɛːn]) is a surname. Notable people with the surname include:

- Armand A. Dufresne Jr. (1909–1994), Justice of the Maine Supreme Judicial Court
- Begoña Vía-Dufresne (born 1971), Spanish sailor and Olympic champion
- Bertrand Dufresne (1736–1801), French financier, civil servant and politician
- Charles Dufresne (1876–1938), French painter
- Chris Dufresne (1958–2020), American sports journalist
- Diane Dufresne (born 1944), Canadian singer and painter
- Donald Dufresne (born 1967), retired Canadian ice hockey defenceman
- Gaston Dufresne (1898–1998), contrabassist in the Boston Symphony Orchestra
- Gérard Dufresne (1918–2013), politician and military officer in Quebec
- Guillaume Dufresne d'Arsel, who established French rule of Mauritius
- Jean Dufresne (1829–1893), German chess player
- John Dufresne (born 1948), American author of French-Canadian descent
- Joseph Dufresne (1805–1873), Quebec notary and political figure
- Laurent Dufresne (born 1972), former French football team captain
- Louis Dufresne (1752–1832), French explorer, ornithologist and taxidermist
- Marc-Joseph Marion du Fresne (1724–1772), French explorer
- Nicole duFresne (1977–2005), American playwright and actress
- Robert DuFresne (1921-2015), American educator
- Wylie Dufresne (born 1970), chef and restaurant owner in Manhattan

== Fictional people ==
- Andy Dufresne, the protagonist of the film The Shawshank Redemption and the novella the film is based on
- Frank 'Doc' DuFresne, a character in the web television series Red vs. Blue
